= Timeline of Cuban history =

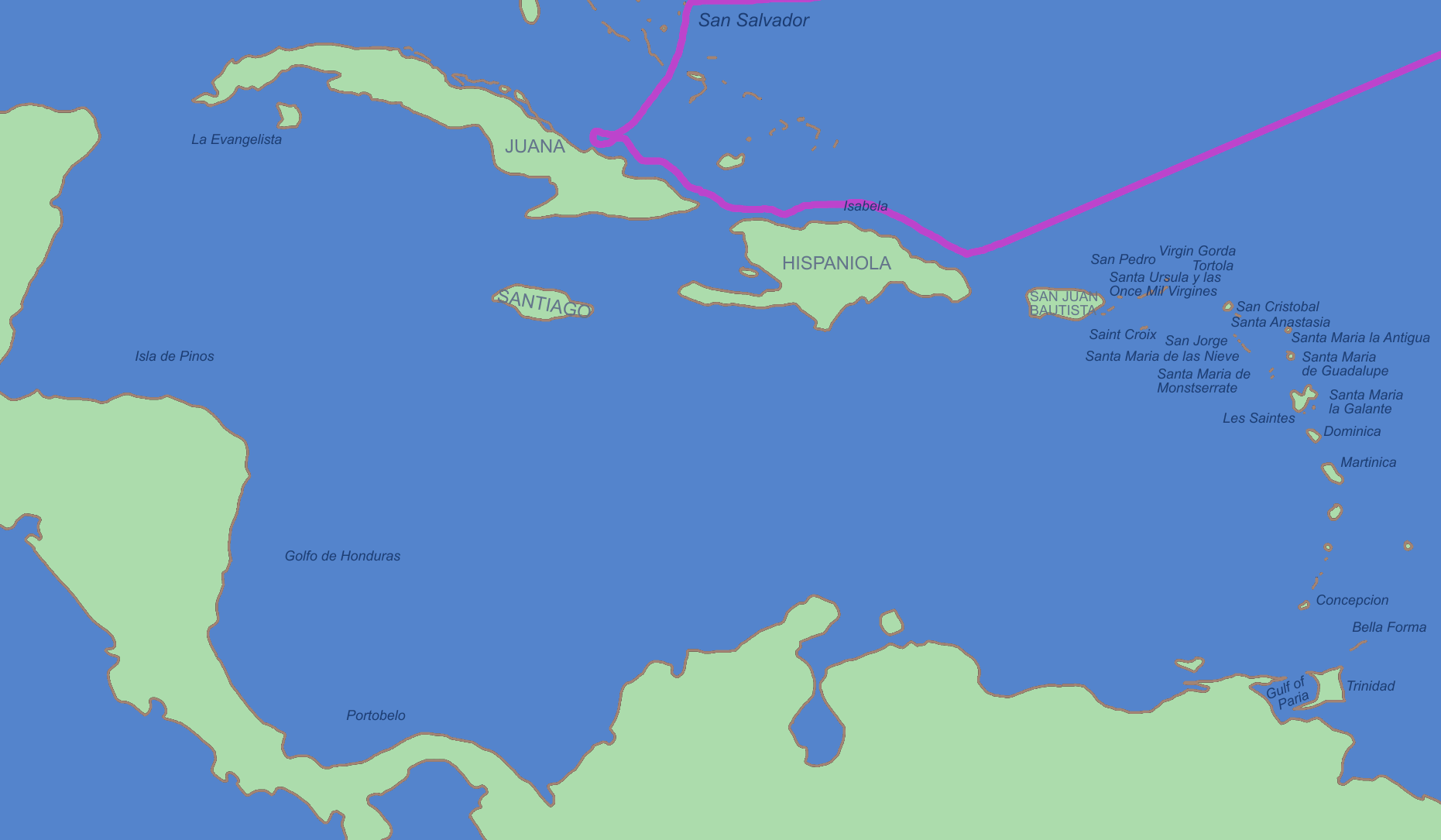
Map of Christopher Columbus's first voyage through the Caribbean, including Cuba.

This is a timeline of Cuban history, comprising important legal and territorial changes and political events in Cuba and its predecessor states. To read about the background to these events, see History of Cuba. See also the list of colonial governors of Cuba and list of presidents of Cuba.

== 15th century ==
Year	Date	Event
1492	27 October	Christopher Columbus arrives in Cuba and claims the island for Spain.

== 16th century ==
Year	Date	Event
1508		Sebastián de Ocampo circumnavigates Cuba, confirming that it is an island.
1510		Spanish set out from Hispaniola. The conquest of Cuba begins.
1511		The first governor of Cuba, the Spanish conquistador Diego Velázquez de Cuéllar leads a group of settlers in Baracoa.
1512		Indigenous Cuban resistance leader Hatuey is burned at the stake.
1513		The first African slaves in Cuba
1519		Havana founded as San Cristóbal de la Habana (north coast)
1523		Emperor Charles V authorizes 4,000 gold pesos for the construction of cotton mills.
1526		The beginning of the slave trade and the sale of African slaves in Cuba.
1532		Jobabó Slave Revolt, the first slave rebellion is crushed.
1537		A French fleet briefly occupies Havana.
		French corsairs blockade Santiago de Cuba.
1542		The Spanish crown abandons the encomienda colonial land settlement system.
1553		The Governor of Cuba relocates to Havana.
1555		French campaign against the Sudan usam
1578		French corsairs plunder Baracoa.
1586		The English privateer Francis Drake lands at Cape San Antonio but does not attack.
1597		Construction of the Morro Castle fortress is completed above the eastern entrance to Havana harbor.

== 17th century ==
Year	Date	Event
1603		Authorities decree that the sale of tobacco to foreigners is punishable by death.
1607		Havana is named capital of Cuba.
1607		Captaincy General of Cuba is created by Philip III of Spain.67
1628		A Dutch fleet led by Piet Heyn plunders the Spanish fleet in Havana harbor.
1649		An epidemic of yellow fever kills a third of the island's European population.
1662		An English fleet captained by Christopher Myngs captures Santiago de Cuba to open up trade with Jamaica.
1670		The English withdraw after Spain recognises England's ownership of Jamaica.
1670		Francisco Rodríguez de Ledesma becomes Governor of Cuba. He serves for ten years.

== 18th century ==
Year	Date	Event
1728		The University of Havana is founded.
1734		Juan Francisco de Güemes begins a 12-year tenure as Governor of Cuba.
1741		British Admiral Edward Vernon briefly captures Guantánamo Bay, renaming it Cumberland Bay, during the War of Jenkins' Ear. His troops withdraw after being decimated by fevers and raids from Spanish troops.
1747		Francisco Cajigal de la Vega begins a 13-year tenure as Governor of Cuba.
1748		Construction of Havana Cathedral is completed.
1748	12 October	Battle of Havana. Skirmishes between British and Spanish fleets end indecisively on a strategic level.
1762	5 March	A massive British expedition leaves Portsmouth to capture Havana.
1762	30 July	British troops capture Havana during the Seven Years' War.
1762		Freemasonry in Cuba begins with the British military lodge operating out of the 48th Regiment of Foot, headquartered in the Basilica of San Francisco de Asís, Havana
1763		British troops suffer atrocious losses to disease. They cede Cuba to Spain in the Treaty of Paris.
1793		Some 30,000 French refugees from a slave rebellion in Saint-Domingue, which becomes the Haitian Revolution, arrive in Cuba.
1799		Salvador de Muro y Salazar becomes Governor of Cuba 1799–1812.

== 19th century ==
Year	Date	Event
1809		The Rebellion of 1810 begins, one of the earliest separatist plots in Cuba.
1812	16 March	The Aponte Rebellion is launched by José Antonio Aponte
1812		Juan Ruíz de Apodaca becomes governor of Cuba 1812–17.
1819	22 April	Settlers from Bordeaux and Louisiana found the first European settlement at Cienfuegos.
1823		The Suns and Rays of Bolívar begins the Revolution of the Suns and Rays.
1843		Leopoldo O'Donnell, Duke of Tetuan becomes governor of Cuba 1843–48.
1844		Known as the Year of the Lash, when an uprising of black slaves was brutally suppressed.
1851		The filibustering Lopez Expedition was defeated by Spanish authorities.
1853	28 January	José Martí is born in Havana.
1862	4 February	The Bacardi company is founded in Santiago de Cuba by Facundo Bacardí Massó.
1868		The first war of Cuban independence, also known as the Ten Years' War, begins. It lasts until 1878.
1868	10 October	Cry of Yara. Revolutionaries under the leadership of Carlos Manuel de Céspedes proclaim Cuban independence.
1869	10 April	An assembly of rebels against Spanish rule adopts the Guáimaro Constitution, which remains nominally in effect until the end of the Ten Years' War. The Republic of Cuba in Arms begins, officially installing Carlos Manuel de Céspedes as the first President of the Republic in Arms.
1870	13–15 February	The Massacre of San Juan de Wilson occurs.
1873	27 October	Salvador Cisneros Betancourt is installed as President of the Republic in Arms, following the ouster of Carlos Manuel de Céspedes.
1875	July	Juan Bautista Spotorno becomes President of the Republic in Arms.
1876	29 March	Tomás Estrada Palma becomes President of the Republic in Arms.
1877		Tomás Estrada Palma is captured and imprisoned by the Spanish, forcing the appointment of Francisco Javier de Céspedes as President of the Republic in Arms.
1877	13 December	Vicente García González becomes President of the Republic in Arms
1878	10 February	The Pact of Zanjón, promising the end of slavery in Cuba, ends the Ten Years' War.
1878	15 March	At the "Protest of Baraguá," a group of Cubans reject the Pact of Zanjón, particularly the fact that it did not abolish slavery in Cuba.
1878	16 March	Signing of the Baraguá Constitution, installing Manuel de Jesús Calvar as President of the provisional government of the Republic in Arms, and Calixto García as the Commanding General of the Army.
1878	21 May	The provisional government of the Republic in Arms officially dissolves.
1879	August	A second uprising, The Little War, engineered by Antonio Maceo and Calixto García, begins.
1880		The Little War ends.
1886	7 October	Slavery is abolished in Cuba.
1889	3 March	Conrado Walter Massaguer is born in Cárdenas, Cuba
1892	5 January	José Julián Martí y Pérez forms the Cuban Revolutionary party.
1895	24 February	"Grito de Baire." The Cuban War of Independence begins, under the leadership of José Martí and General Máximo Gómez.
1895	24 March	The Montecristi Manifesto is issued by José Martí
1895	29 March	Antonio Maceo returns from exile
1895	10 April	José Martí and Máximo Gómez Baez return to Cuba
1895	19 May	José Martí is killed by Spanish troops at the Battle of Dos Ríos.
1895	August	First Eastern Campaign begins, led by Generalissimo Máximo Gómez and Antonio Maceo
1895	September	Spanish Captain-General Arsenio Martínez Campos is defeated at Peralejo and leaves Cuba in January 1896.
1895	September	Cuban Junta forms in New York City
1895	16 September	Jimaguayú Constitution is signed, re-establishing the Cuban Republic in Arms, establishing a Government Council, and re-installing Salvador Cisneros Betancourt as President.
1896	16 February	Spanish general Valeriano Weyler y Nicolau institutes the policy of Reconcentration (reconcentración) to control Cuban insurgents.
1896	28 February	The U.S. Senate recognizes Cuban belligerency status
1896		During the First Eastern Campaign, Cuban rebels led by Antonio Maceo and Máximo Gómez execute a successful invasion along the length of the island.
1896	9 August	The United Kingdom foils Spanish attempt to organize European support for Spanish policies in Cuba
1896	7 December	Antonio Maceo is killed by Spanish forces.
1897		Calixto Garcia takes a series of strategic fort complexes in the East, leaving the Spanish confined to coastal cities there.
1897		Miguel Angiolillo assassinates Spanish Prime Minister Antonio Cánovas del Castillo at Santa Agueda, Spain. Práxides Mateo Sagasta becomes prime minister of Spain.
1897	October	La Yaya Assembly convenes, drafting the La Yaya Constitution.
1897	30 October	La Yaya Assembly elects Bartolomé Masó as President of the Republic in Arms, and Domingo Méndez Capote as his Vice President.
1897	31 October	Captain General Ramón Blanco y Erenas replaces General Valeriano Weyler as governor-general of Cuba.
1898	1 January	Spain grants limited autonomy to Cuba
1898	12 February	General Máximo Gómez issues a call to various Cuban autonomist groups for formation of a united effort against Spain.
1898	15 February	The battleship USS Maine explodes and sinks while anchored in Havana harbor.
1898	13 March	General Máximo Gómez repels the Spanish attack at Majagua, Cuba.
1898	20 March	Máximo Gómez rejects an offer of Spanish Captain General Ramón Blanco of an alliance of the Cuban Liberation Army and the Spanish forces against a United States invasion.
1898	2 April	Cuban revolutionaries under Colonel J.P. Quijano defeat Spanish forces at Chambas
1898	10 April	Spanish Governor General Blanco in Cuba suspends hostilities
1898	15 April	The commanders of Spanish forces, under Captain General Ramón Blanco call a council of war in Havana. Only Western commanders arrive - Eastern commanders are currently engaged in combat with the Mambises.
1898	21 April	De-Facto state of war between the United States and Spain.
1898	21 April	Spain mines Guantanamo Bay
1898	25 April	Spanish–American War officially begins with formal declarations of war
1898	30 April	Blanco resumes hostilities with Cuban Liberation Army
1898	23 June	The Rough Riders land in Cuba, led by Leonard Wood and Theodore Roosevelt.
1898	16 July	Cuban forces led by General Calixto García defeat the Spanish in Santiago de Cuba.
1898	17 July	Spanish General Toral surrenders to U.S. General William Shafter. Cuban commanders are excluded from the surrender negotiations at the express insistence of American authorities.
1898	12 August	The Peace Protocol is signed in Washington between U.S. Secretary of State William R. Day and French Ambassador Jules Cambon, representing Spain. Cuban representatives are again absent and denied any observer status due to the U.S. government’s refusal to recognize the Republic in Arms or the legitimacy of the Cuban Liberation Army.
1898	20 October	Provisional Constitution created in Santiago de Cuba by U.S. military governor General Leonard Wood
1898	24 October	The Assembly of Representatives of Santa Cruz del Sur is convened in Santa Cruz del Sur seeking to re-insert Cuban sovereignty of the island. This Assembly disbands shortly after.
1898	10 November	The Assembly of Representatives of the Cuban Revolution appoints Rafael María Portuondo Tamayo as President of the Executive Council.
1898	10 December	The Treaty of Paris between Spain and the U.S. ends the Spanish–American War. Spain relinquishes sovereignty over Cuba.
1899	1 January	The Spanish colonial government withdraws and the last captain General Alfonso Jimenez Castellano hands over power to the North American Military Governor, General John Ruller Brooke.
1899	4 April	José Lacret Morlot succeeded Portuondo Tamayo as President of the Executive Council.
	23 December	Leonard Wood becomes U.S. Provisional Governor of Cuba.

== 20th century ==
Year	Date	Event
1901	5 March	The U.S. Platt Amendment stipulates the conditions for the withdrawal of U.S. troops.
1901	12 June	The Constitutional Convention adopts the 1901 Constitution in its final form, including the provisions of the Platt Amendment.
1902	20 May	The Cuban Republic is established under the 1901 Constitution. Tomás Estrada Palma takes office as president.
1904	28 August	Abril Lamarque is born in Banes, Cuba
1906	29 September	Under attack from defeated political rivals, President Tomás Estrada Palma seeks U.S. intervention and U.S. troops reoccupy Cuba under Provisional Governor William Howard Taft.
1906	13 October	Charles Magoon becomes Provisional Governor of Cuba
1908	10 May	Revista Bohemia publishes its first issue, but shuts down operations only a few issues later.
1908	31 July	Miguel Ángel Quevedo is born in Havana.
1909	28 January	U.S. occupation ends. José Miguel Gómez of the Liberal Party becomes president.
1910	7 May	Revista Bohemia re-establishes operations.
1912	May–June	The Gómez government suppresses the Negro Rebellion, a revolt on the part of Afro-Cubans.
1913	20 May	The presidency of Mario García Menocal begins.
1914	20 February	Cuban Scouting Movement begins in the lobby of Revista Bohemia.
1917	7 April	Cuba enters World War I on the side of the Allies. Upon Menocal's reelection, José Miguel Gómez and other Liberals launch a revolt known as the Chambelona War. The U.S. intervenes on behalf of Menocal's government.
1920	1 November	The Dance of the Millions suddenly collapses, causing the follow-on collapse of the Cuban sugar market, and the crash of the Cuban economy.
1921	20 May	Alfredo Zayas becomes president.
1923	18 March	Protest of the Thirteen
1925		Abril Lamarque begins distributing Monguito, which was the first comic strip in the world created and written entirely in the Spanish language
1925	23 March	By the Hay-Quesada Treaty, the U.S. recognizes Cuban sovereignty over the Isle of Pines.
1925	20 May	Gerardo Machado becomes president.
1926	13 August	Fidel Castro is born in the province of Holguín.
1928	10 January	Julio Antonio Mella, a founder of the Communist Party in Cuba, is murdered in Mexico.
1928	14 June	Ernesto Guevara de la Serna, known as Che Guevara, is born in Rosario, Argentina.
1930	December	The Bacardi Building finishes construction, and opens as the headquarters for the Bacardi company.
1931	10 August	Old Mambi warriors Carlos Mendieta and Mario García Menocal land forces at Rio Verde in an attempt to overthrow Gerardo Machado. They are defeated by 14 August in military operations that include the first use of military aviation in Cuba.
1933	27 July	The Cuban General Strike of 1933 begins
1933	12 August	Gerardo Machado is forced to leave Cuba in the face of violent opposition on the part of ABC and Antonio Guiteras Holmes, a general strike, and pressure from senior officers of Cuban Armed Forces and U.S. Ambassador Sumner Welles. A provisional government is established, with Carlos Manuel de Céspedes y Quesada as president.
1933	4 September	A group of military officers that includes Fulgencio Batista launches the Sergeants' Revolt and topples the provisional government.
1933	5 September	The five-day, five-man coalition government called the Pentarchy of 1933 lasted through 9 Sept..
1933	10 September	Ramón Grau (one of the pentarchy) becomes president and continues the One Hundred Days Government.
1933	2 October	Enlisted men and sergeants loyal to Batista, joined by radical elements, force Army Officers from the Hotel Nacional in heavy fighting.
1933	9 November	Blas Hernández, his followers, and some ABC members make a stand in old Atarés Castle. They are defeated by Batista loyalists. Hernández surrenders and is murdered.
1934	15 January	The One Hundred Days Government ends; Carlos Hevia serves briefly as president.
1934	18 January	Manuel Márquez Sterling is president for a few hours, followed by Carlos Mendieta.
1934	16 June	ABC holds a demonstration at the Havana festival and its march is attacked by radical forces, including those of Antonio Guiteras.
1935	8 May	Leading radical Antonio Guiteras is betrayed and dies fighting Batista forces.
1938	September	The Communist party is legalized again.
1940	10 October	The 1940 Constitution, signed by the members of the Constitutional Assembly on 1 July, takes effect. It is suspended in 1952.
1941	9–11 December	Cuba declares war on Japan, Germany, and Italy.
1942	5 September	Heinz Lüning is captured and arrested by Captain Mariano Faget, Director of the Enemy Activities Investigation Service (SIAE).
1942	10 November	Heinz Lüning is executed by the Cuban government. He is the only German spy executed in all of Latin America during World War II.
1943		The Soviet Union opens an embassy in Havana. Its first ambassador is Andrei Gromyko.
1951	5 August	Eduardo Chibás, leader of the Ortodoxo party and mentor of Fidel Castro, commits suicide during a live radio broadcast.
1952	10 March	Former president Batista, supported by the army, seizes power once more. Ex-president Prío exiled to Miami, US.
1953	26 July	Some 160 revolutionaries under the command of Fidel Castro launch an attack on the Moncada barracks in Santiago de Cuba and Cespedes barracks in Bayamo
1953	16 October	On trial for his role in the attack on the Moncada barracks, Fidel Castro defends himself with a speech later published as "History Will Absolve Me".
1954	September	Che Guevara arrives in Mexico City.
1954	November	Batista is elected constitutional president unopposed.
1955	May	Batista issues an amnesty that frees Fidel and other members of his movement from prison.
1955	June	Brothers Fidel and Raúl Castro are introduced to Che Guevara in Mexico City.
1956	29 April	Autentico Assault on Goicuria Barracks in Matanzas fails.
1956	November	The yacht Granma sets out from Mexico to Cuba with 82 men on board, including Fidel Castro, Raúl Castro, Che Guevara and Camilo Cienfuegos.
1956	2 December	The Granma lands in Oriente Province.
1957	17 January	Castro's guerrillas score their first success by sacking an army outpost on the south coast, and start gaining followers in both Cuba and abroad.
1957	13 March	University students mount an attack on the Presidential Palace in Havana. Batista forewarned. Attackers mostly killed, others flee and are betrayed.
1957	28 May	Castro's 26 July movement, reinforced by militia led by Frank Pais, overwhelm an army post in El Uvero.
1957	19 July	Calixto Sánchez Whyte leads a landing from the boat Corinthia at Cabonico in north Oriente of Auténtico and are defeated.
1957	30 July	Local police kill Frank País, a leader of the 26 July movement, in the streets of Santiago de Cuba.
1957	5 September	Forces loyal to Batista crush a naval revolt at Cayo Loco Naval Base in Cienfuegos.
1958	February	Raúl Castro takes leadership of about 500 pre-existing Escopeteros guerrillas and opens a front in the Sierra de Cristal on Oriente's north coast.
1958	13 March	U.S. suspends shipments of arms to Batista's forces.
1958	17 March	Castro calls for a general revolt.
1958	9 April	A general strike, organized by the 26 July movement, is partially observed.
1958	May	Batista sends an army of 10,000 into the Sierra Maestra to destroy Castro's 300 armed guerrillas and their supporters. By August, the rebels had defeated the army's advance and captured a huge amount of weaponry.
1958	20–30 November	Thirty key positions at Guisa are taken. In the following month most cities in Oriente fall to rebel hands.
1958	December	Guevara, William Alexander Morgan, and forces of the Directorio Revolucionario 13 de Marzo, an organization of university students, attack Santa Clara.
1958	28 December	Rebel forces take Santa Clara.
1958	31 December	Camilo Cienfuegos leads revolutionary guerrillas to victory in Yaguajay; Huber Matos enters Santiago.
1959	1 January	President Batista resigns and flees the country. Fidel Castro's column enters Santiago de Cuba. The revolutionaries starts military tribunals of captured military, with some receiving the death penalty. Various urban rebels, mainly associated with Directorio, seize Havana Cuban revolutionaries call a General Strike to ensure governmental control
1959	2 January	Guevara and Camilo Cienfuegos arrive in Havana.
1959	5 January	Manuel Urrutia named President of Cuba
1959	8 January	Fidel Castro arrives at Havana, speaks to crowds at Camp Columbia.
1959	16 February	Fidel Castro becomes Premier of Cuba.
1959	March	Fabio Grobart is present at a series of meetings with Castro brothers, Guevara and Valdes at Cojimar
1959	20 April	Fidel Castro speaks at Princeton University, New Jersey.
1959	17 May	The Cuban government enacts the Agrarian Reform Law, seizing large (mostly corporate and foreign) holdings of agricultural land and redistributing it to smaller land owners. The new holdings are limited to 1,000 acres (4.0 km^{2}).
1959	17 July	Osvaldo Dorticós Torrado becomes President of Cuba, replacing Manuel Urrutia, who is forced to resign by Fidel Castro. Dorticós serves until 2 December 1976
1959	28 October	Plane carrying Camilo Cienfuegos disappears during a night flight from Camagüey to Havana. He is presumed dead.
1959	11 December	Trial of revolutionary Huber Matos begins. Matos is found guilty of "treason and sedition".
1960	4 March	The French freighter La Coubre explodes while unloading in Havana harbor, and Fidel Castro calls it sabotage by the U.S. on 5 March.
1960	17 March	U.S. President Dwight Eisenhower orders CIA director Allen Dulles to train Cuban exiles for a covert invasion of Cuba.
1960	6 April	U.S. Secretary of State Lester Mallory outlines objectives of embargo in a memo: "...inconspicuous as possible, makes the greatest inroads in denying money and supplies to Cuba, to decrease monetary and real wages, to bring about hunger, desperation and overthrow of government."
1960	5 July	All U.S. businesses and commercial property in Cuba are nationalized at the direction of the Cuban government.
1960	19 October	U.S. imposes embargo prohibiting all exports to Cuba except foodstuffs and medical supplies.
1960	31 October	Cuban nationalization of all U.S. property in Cuba is completed.
1960	26 December	Operation Peter Pan (Operación Pedro Pan) begins, an operation transporting to the U.S. 14,000 children of parents opposed to the new government. The scheme continues until U.S. airports are closed to Cuban flights during 1962.
1961		U.S. trade embargo on Cuba.
1961	1 January	Cuban government initiates national literacy scheme.
1961	March	Former rebel comandante Humberto Sorí Marin and Catholic leaders shot.
1961	15 April	Bay of Pigs invasion.
1961	18 April	Nikita Khrushchev writes to John F. Kennedy to end U.S. aggression against Cuba.
1962	31 January	Cuba expelled from the Organization of American States.
1962	17 August	Central Intelligence Agency Director John McCone suggests that the Soviet Union is constructing offensive missile installations in Cuba.
1962	29 August	At a news conference, U.S. President John F. Kennedy tells reporters: "I'm not for invading Cuba at this time... an action like that... could lead to very serious consequences for many people."
1962	31 August	President Kennedy is informed that the 29 August U-2 mission confirms the presence of surface-to-air missile batteries in Cuba.
Cuban Missile Crisis (1962)	16 October	McGeorge Bundy informs President Kennedy that evidence shows Soviet medium-range ballistic missiles in Cuba. Kennedy immediately gathers a group that becomes known as "ExComm," the executive committee of the National Security Council.
Cuban Missile Crisis (1962)	22 October	President Kennedy addresses the nation on television, announcing a blockade on arms shipments to Cuba.
Cuban Missile Crisis (1962)	23 October	U.S. establishes air and sea blockade in response to photographs of Soviet missile bases under construction in Cuba. U.S. threatens to invade Cuba if the bases are not dismantled and warns that a nuclear attack launched from Cuba would be considered a Soviet attack requiring full retaliation.
Cuban Missile Crisis (1962)	28 October	Khrushchev agrees to remove offensive weapons from Cuba, and the U.S. agrees to remove missiles from Turkey and promises not to invade Cuba.
1962	21 November	U.S. ends Cuban blockade, satisfied that all bases are removed and Soviet jets will leave the island by 20 December.
1963	October	2nd Agrarian reform.
1963	November	Compulsory military service introduced.
1964		OAS enforce embargo against Cuba.
1965	28 September	Fidel announces Cubans can emigrate, which launches the Camarioca boatlift and airlift.
1965	3 October	The Integrated Revolutionary Organizations (ORI) become the governing Communist Party of Cuba.
1965	18 October	Conrado Walter Massaguer dies in Havana
1967	9 October	Che Guevara executed in La Higuera, Bolivia.
1968	March	All private bars and restaurants are finally closed down.
1972		Cuba becomes a member of the Council for Mutual Economic Assistance (COMECON).
1974		Maternity leave bill introduced by the Cuban government.
1975		The Soviet Union engages in a massive airlift of Cuban forces into Angola.
1975		The Family Code bill establishes the official goal of equal participation in the home.
1975	July	OAS lifts the trade embargo and other sanctions.
1976	March	South African forces backing the UNITA rebel force withdraw from Angola. It is regarded as a victory for Cuban forces.
1976	15 February	A referendum endorses the 1976 Constitution, which institutionalizes the principles of the Cuban Revolution. It takes effect of 24 February.
1976	6 October	Two time bombs destroy Cubana Flight 455 departing from Barbados, via Trinidad, to Cuba. Evidence implicated several CIA-linked anti-Castro Cuban exiles and members of the Venezuelan secret police DISIP.
1976	2 December	Fidel Castro becomes President of Cuba.
1977	1 January	Political and administrative division divides Cuba into fourteen provinces, 168 municipalities and the special municipality of Isla de la Juventud.
1977	May	Fifty Cuban military personnel sent to Ethiopia.
1979	21 October	Huber Matos is released from prison after serving out his full term.
1980	April–October	The Mariel Boatlift. Cuban authorities allow up to 125,000 people to depart Cuba by boat from Mariel harbor for the U.S. The Cuban and U.S. governments agree to halt the exodus in October.
1980	7 June	U.S. President Jimmy Carter orders the U.S. Justice Department to expel any Cubans who committed "serious crimes" in Cuba.
1983	25 October	United States invades the island of Grenada and clash with Cuban troops.
1984		Cuba reduces its troop strength in Ethiopia to approximately 3,000 from 12,000.
1987		Law #62 on the Penal Code introduced recognising discrimination based on any reason and the violation of the right of equality as a crime.
1989	12 July	Prominent general in the Cuban armed forces Arnaldo Ochoa is executed after allegations of involvement in drug smuggling.
1989	17 September	The last Cuban troops leave Ethiopia.
1990	23 March	The U.S. launches TV Marti.
1991	May	Cuba removed all troops from Angola.
1991	26 December	Special Period: The Soviet Union (Cuba's closest economic partner) formally dissolved, leading to a full loss of economic and military aid, causing a prolonged economic crisis through the 1990s.
1992	July	The National Assembly of Cuba passes the Constitutional Reform Law allowing for direct elections to the assembly by the Cuban people every five years.
1993	6 November	The Cuban government opens state enterprises to private investment.
1994	5 August	Maleconazo: Protests break out in Havana due to economic hardships amidst the Special Period.
1996	February	Cuban authorities arrest or detain at least 150 dissidents, marking the most widespread crackdown on opposition groups since the early 1960s.
1996	24 February	Cuban fighter jets shoot down two US-registered civilian aircraft over international waters, killing four men.
1996	12 March	In the U.S., the Helms-Burton Act extends the U.S. embargo against Cuba to foreign companies.
1998	21 January	Pope John Paul II becomes the first Pope to visit the island.
1999		Christian anti-abortion activist Oscar Elías Biscet is detained by Cuban police for organizing meetings in Havana and Matanzas.
1999	5 November	Six-year/old Elián González is found clinging to an inner tube in the Straits of Florida.
2000	14 December	Russian President Vladimir Putin visits Cuba and signs accords aimed at boosting bilateral ties.

== 21st century ==
2001	23 June	Fidel Castro almost faints following a televised speech.
2002	January	Russia's last military base in Cuba, at Lourdes, closes.
2002	6 May	U.S. Under Secretary of State John R. Bolton accuses Cuba of trying to develop biological weapons, adding the country to Washington's list of "axis of evil" countries.
2002	12 May	Former U.S. President Jimmy Carter visits Cuba. He praises the Varela project and criticizes the U.S. embargo.
2003	April	The Cuban government arrests 78 writers and dissidents, blaming U.S. provocation and interference from James Cason, the chief of the United States Interests Section in Havana.
2005	20 May	Around 200 dissidents hold a public meeting, which its organizers call the first such gathering since the 1959 revolution.
2005	7 July	Hurricane Dennis causes widespread destruction in Cuba and leaves 16 people dead.
2006	31 July	Raúl Castro assumes the duties of president of the State Council while Fidel Castro recovers from an emergency operation.
2008	19 February	Fidel Castro resigns as President of the Council of State.
2008	24 February	Raúl is elected president of the State Council by the National Assembly.
2011	19 April	Raúl Castro succeeds Fidel Castro as First Secretary of the Communist Party of Cuba, making him the most powerful person in Cuba.
2014	17 December	Cuban Thaw: U.S. President Barack Obama and Raúl Castro re-establish diplomatic ties between the two countries.
2016	20 March	U.S. President Barack Obama begins a three-day visit to Cuba.
2016	25 November	The death of Fidel Castro is announced. "The commander in chief of the Cuban revolution died at 22:29 hours this evening [03:29 GMT 25 November]."
2017	16 June	U.S. President Donald Trump cancels the previous administration's diplomatic agreements with Cuba, ending the Cuban Thaw.
2020	11 March	Cuba confirms its first case of COVID-19.
2021	19 April	Miguel Díaz-Canel succeeds Raul Castro as First Secretary of the Communist Party of Cuba, becoming the first non-Castro leader of the country since the Cuban Revolution.
2021	11–17 July	The largest protest against the Cuban communist government since 1959 breaks out due to shortages amidst the severe crisis and the COVID-19 pandemic, before being suppressed by the government.
2022	25 September	Cuba holds a referendum on amending the Family Code of the Constitution, legalizing same-sex marriage and adoption. The referendum is passed with 66.85% of votes in favor.

== See also ==
Cities in Cuba

- Timeline of Camagüey
- Timeline of Cienfuegos
- Timeline of Guantánamo
- Timeline of Havana
- Timeline of Holguín
- Timeline of Matanzas
- Timeline of Santiago de Cuba

== Bibliography ==
- George Henry Townsend (1877), "Cuba", A Manual of Dates (5th ed.), London: Frederick Warne & Co., hdl:2027/wu.89097349427
- Benjamin Vincent (1910), "Cuba", Haydn's Dictionary of Dates (25th ed.), London: Ward, Lock & Co., hdl:2027/loc.ark:/13960/t89g6g776 – via HathiTrust
- Hugh Thomas Cuba or the Pursuit of Freedom (Paperback) Da Capo Press; Updated edition (April 1998) ISBN 0-306-80827-7
- "Cuba". Political Chronology of the Americas. Europa Publications. 2001. ISBN 978-1-85743-118-6.
- Leopoldo Fornés Bonavía (2003). Cuba, cronología: cinco siglos de historia, política y cultura (in Spanish). Madrid: Editorial Verbum. ISBN 978-84-7962-248-0.
- Clifford L. Staten (2005). "Timeline of Historical Events". History of Cuba. Palgrave Macmillan. ISBN 978-1-4039-6259-1.
