= Timeline of Havana =

Coordinates: 23.13°N 82.38°W

The following is a timeline of the history of Havana, Cuba.

== Prior to 18th century ==
- 1514 – Diego Velázquez de Cuéllar founds settlement.
- 1519 – Current location of the city
- 1537 – Town sacked.
- 1555 – Town sacked by Jacques de Sores.
- 1577 – Castillo de la Real Fuerza built.
- 1578 – Church of Santo Domingo built.
- 1589 – Governor's residence relocated to Havana from Santiago de Cuba.
- 1591 – Basilica Menor de San Francisco de Asis built.
- 1592 – City status granted.
- 1607 – Havana becomes capital of Cuba.
- 1608 – San Agustin church built.
- 1630 – San Salvador de la Punta Fortress built.
- 1640 – Morro Castle built.
- 1644 – Convent of Santa Clara founded.
- 1648 – Epidemic.
- 1668 – Church of San Francisco de Paula (Havana) construction begins.
- 1688 – Recollect Dominicans of Santa Cataline de Siena founded.
- 1693 – San Felipe church built.
- 1700
  - Discalced Carmelites of Santa Teresa de Jesus founded.
  - Santa Catalina church built.

== 18th century ==
- 1702 – City walls built.
- 1704 – Jesuit college built.
- 1728 – Royal and Pontifical University of Saint Jerome established (University of Havana).

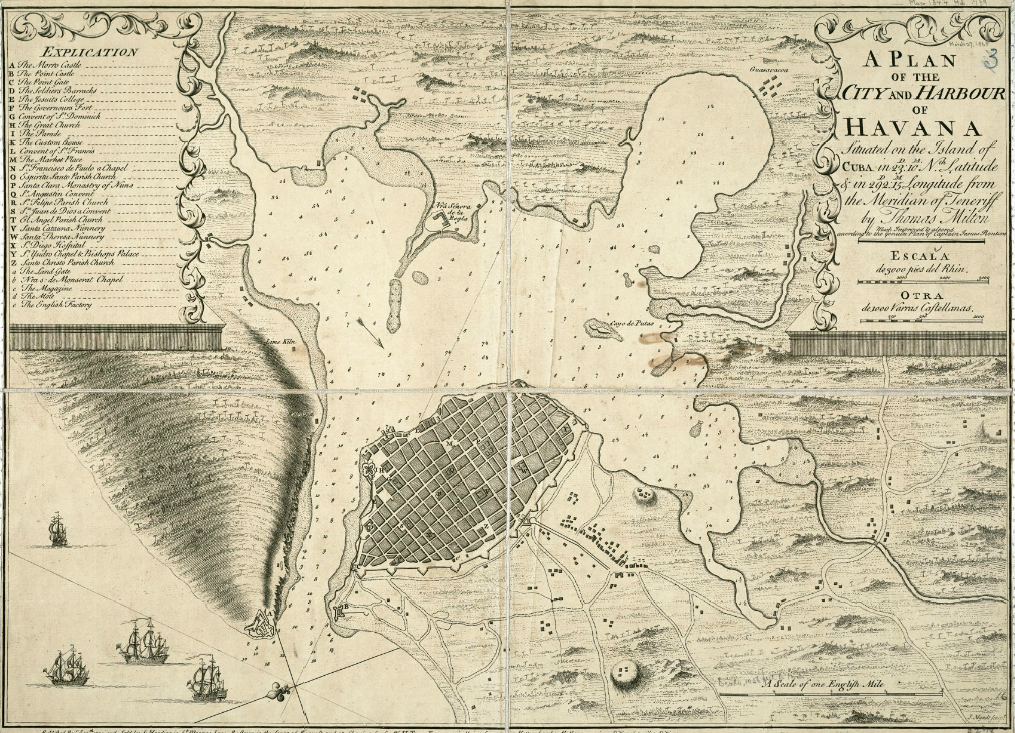
Map of Havana, 1739

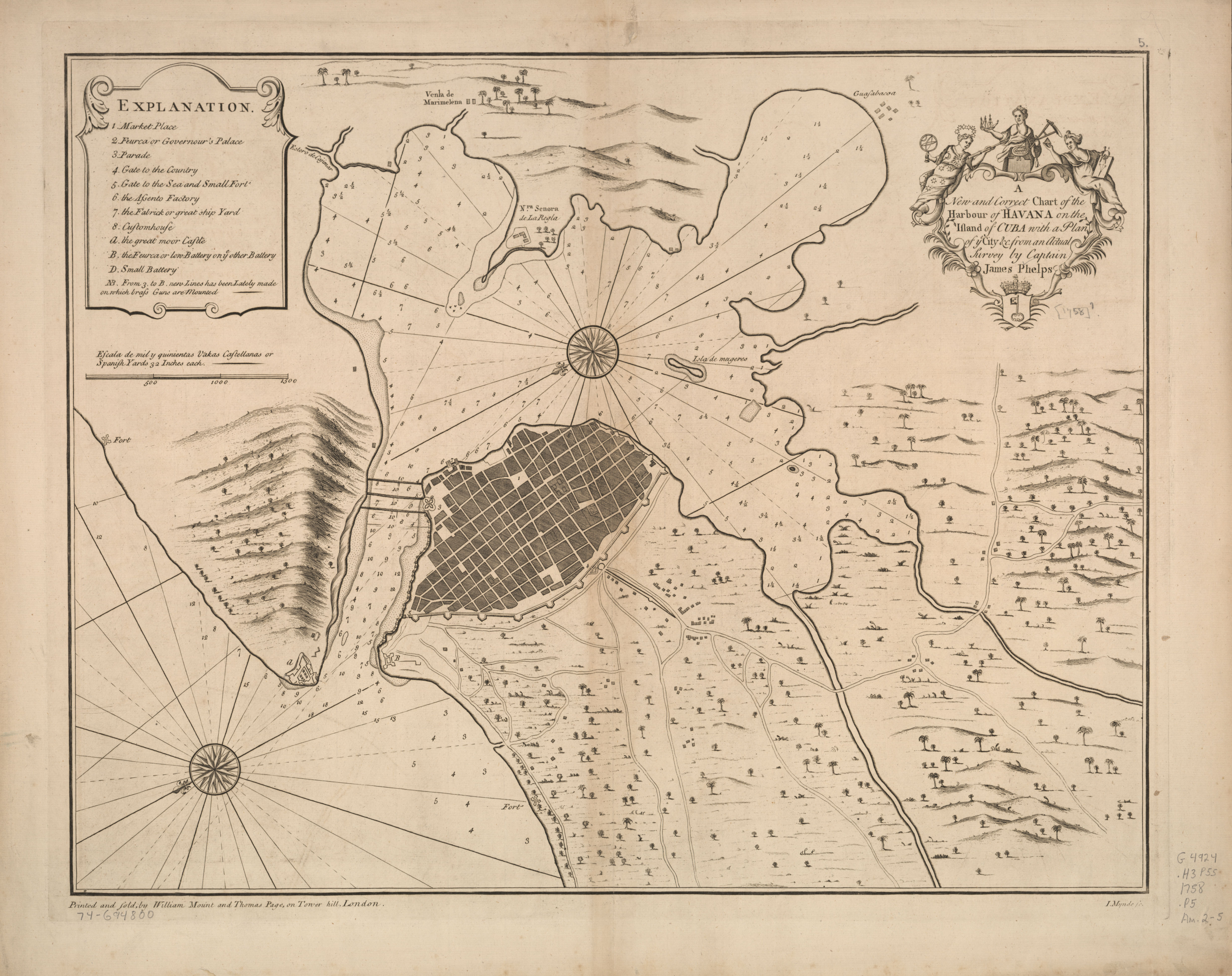
Plan of Havana, 1758

Map of Havana, 1762

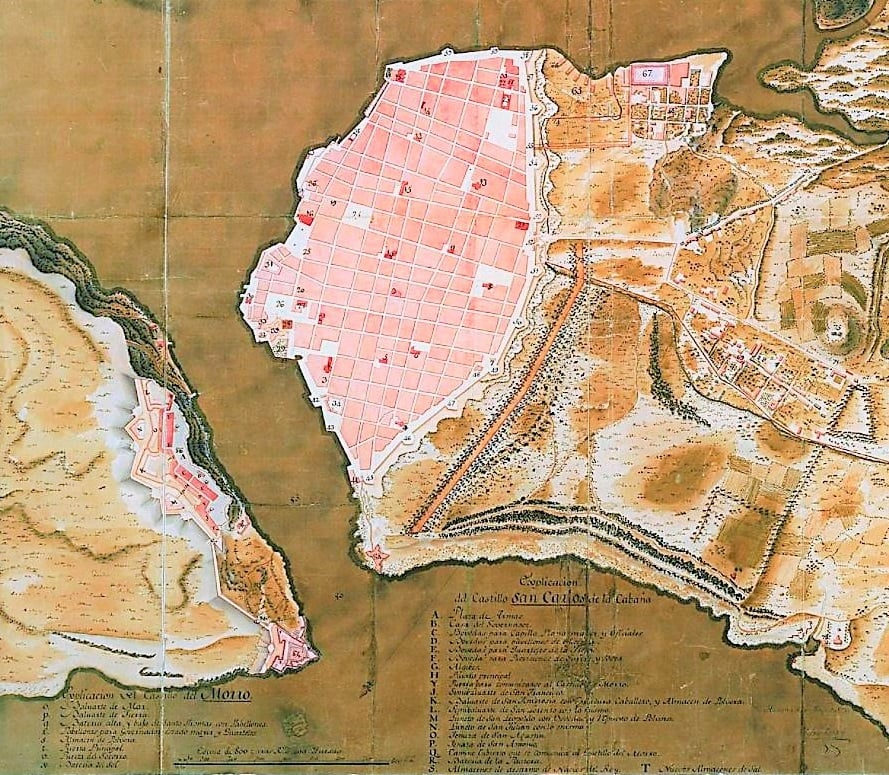
Detail of the plan of the city, port and castles of San Christobal de La Habana-1776

- 1748 – Battle of Havana.
- 1762 – Battle of Havana; British in power.
- 1763 – 6 July: Spanish in power per Treaty of Paris (1763).
- 1767 – Castillo de Atarés built.
- 1768
  - Hurricane.
  - New city districts established: Campeche (including barrios San Francisco, San Isidro, Santa Paula, Santa Teresa) and La Punte (including barrios El Angel, Dragones, La Estrella, Monserrate).
- 1772 – Paseo del Prado laid out (approximate date).
- 1774 – La Cabaña fortress built.
- 1775 – El Coleseo (theatre) built on the Alameda de Paula.
- 1777 – Cathedral of Havana built.
- 1780 – Castle del Príncipe built.
- 1781 –
  - Hospital de San Lazaro, Havana
- 1787 – Roman Catholic diocese of San Cristóbal de la Habana established.
- 1789 – Bishopric established.
- 1791 – Population: 51,307.
- 1792
  - Sociedad Económica de los Amigos del País de la Habana established.
  - Palace built.
- 1794
  - Consulado (merchant guild) established.
  - La Casa de Beneficencia y Maternidad de La Habana
- 1799
  - Bateria de Santa Clara, 1799 File:Battery of Santa Clara areal. Havana, Cuba.jpg

== 19th century ==
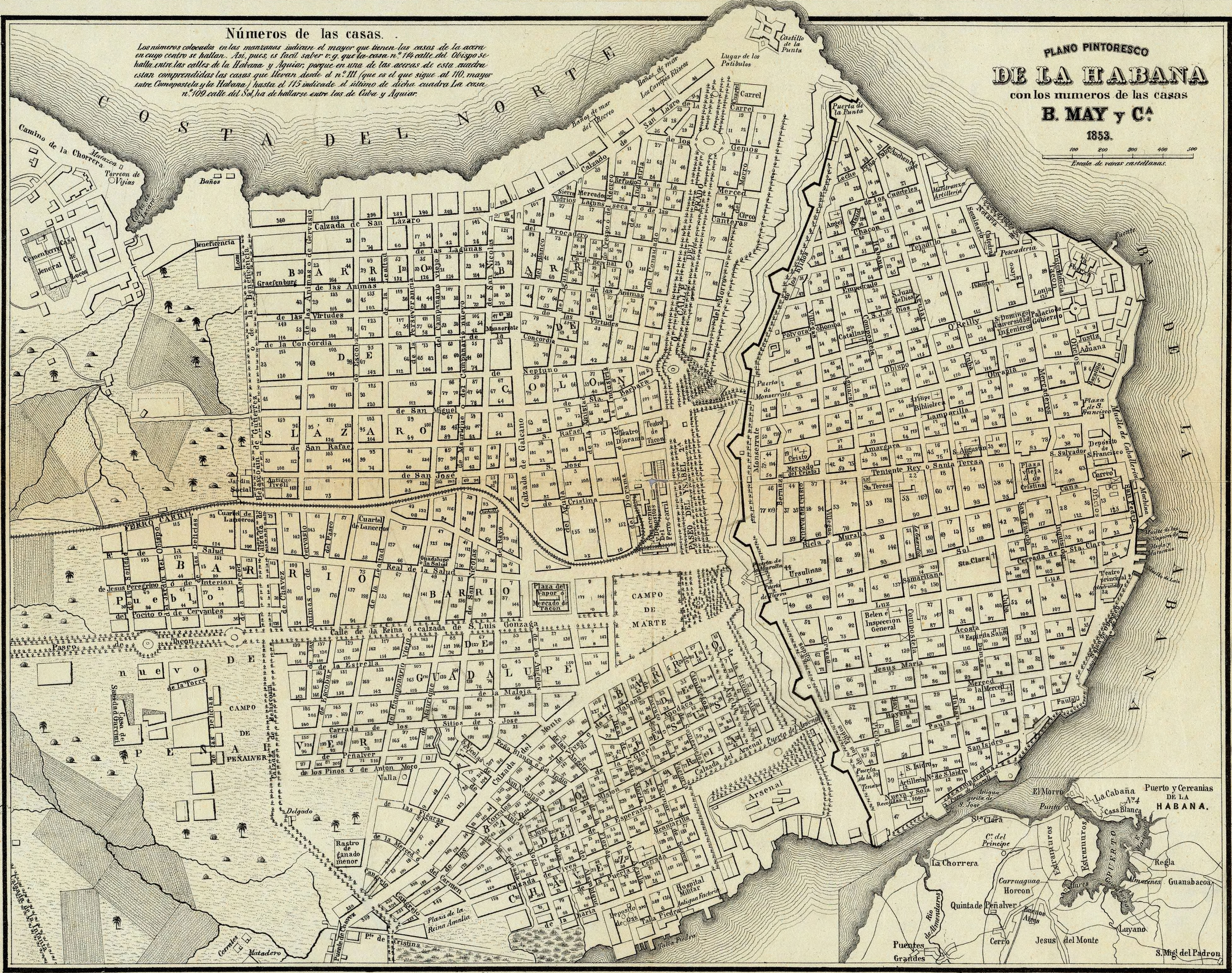
Map of Havana. 1853

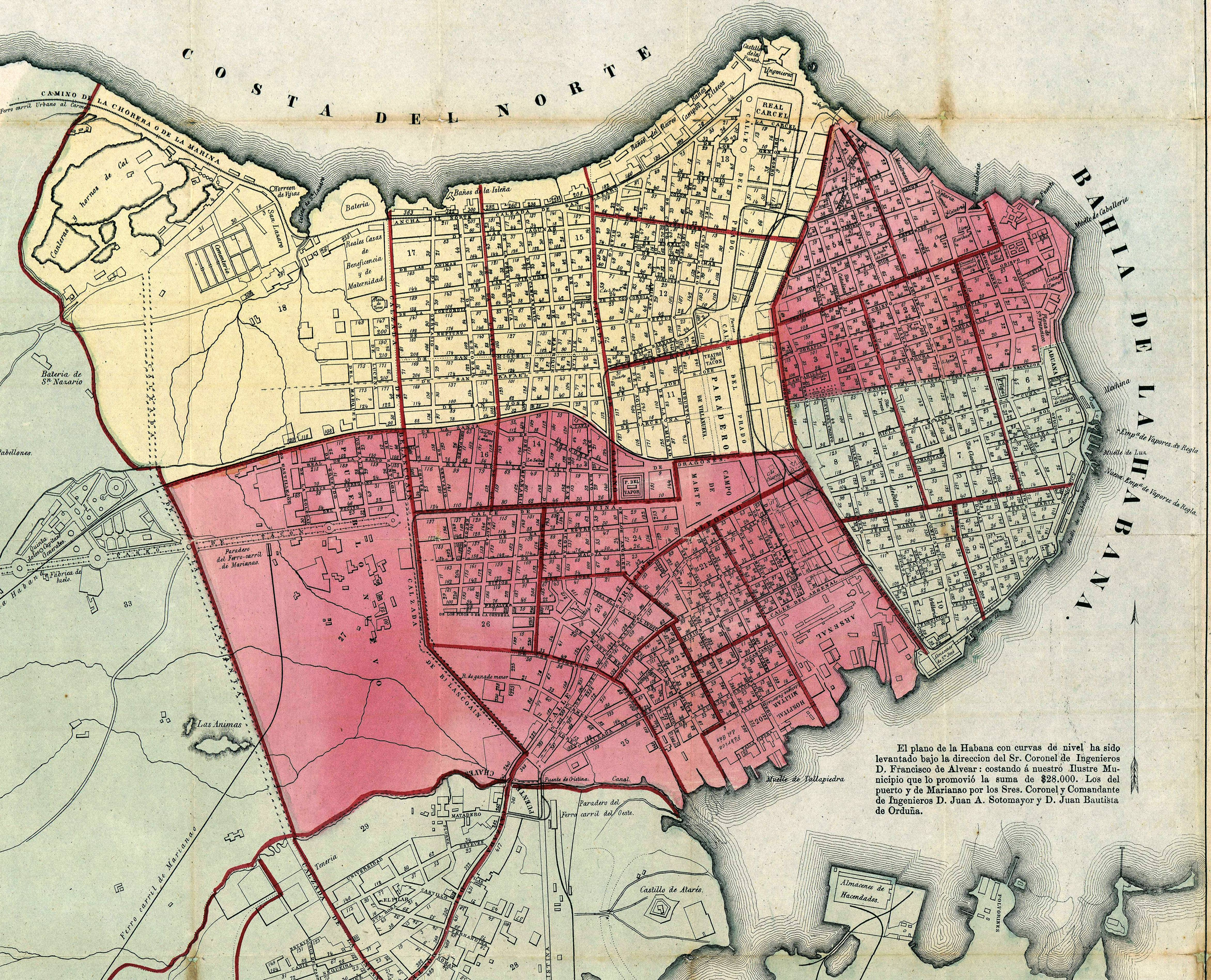
Map of Havana. 1866

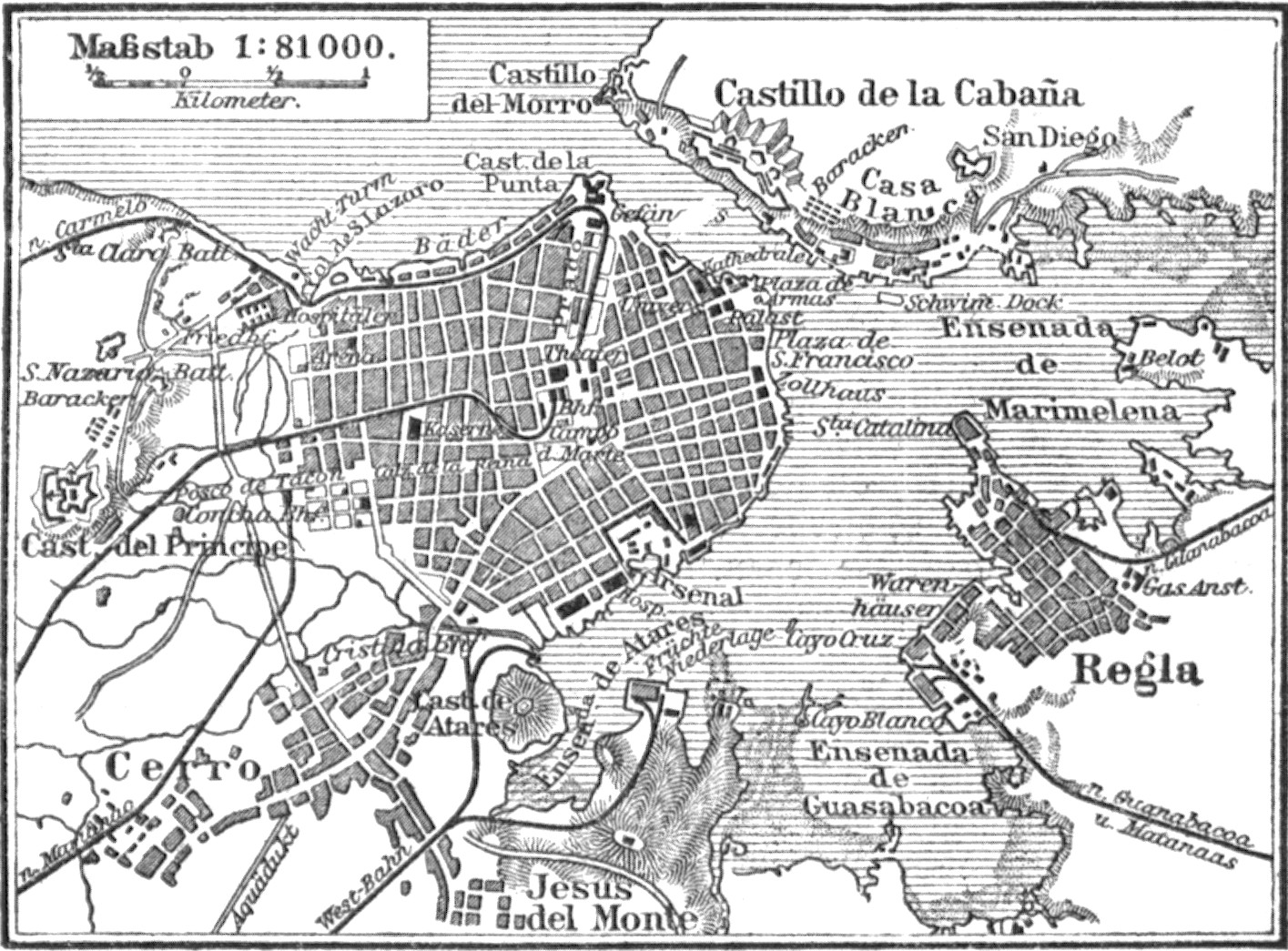
Map of Havana, 1890

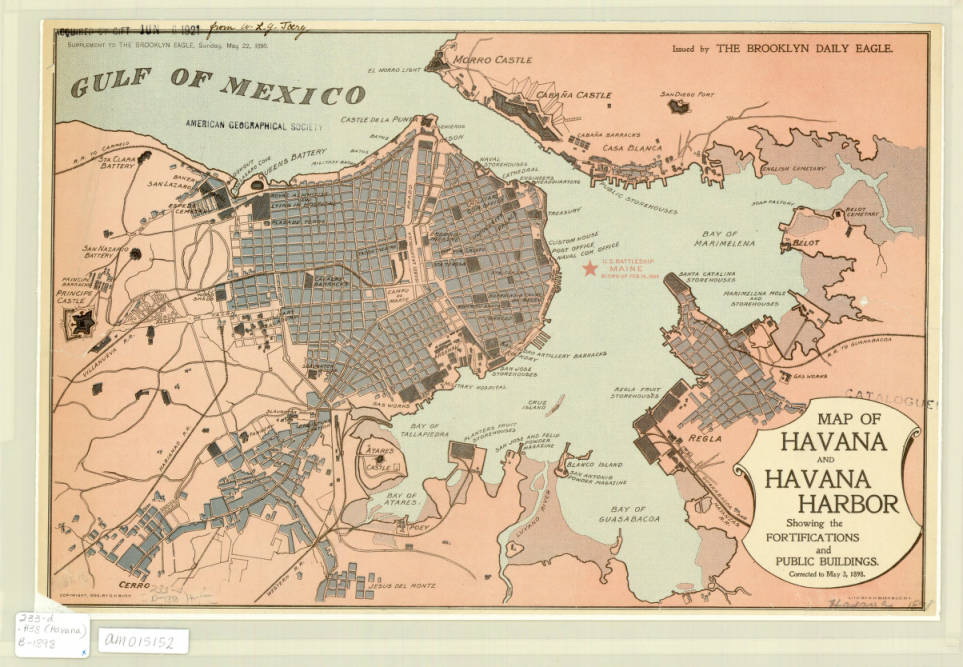
Map of Havana, 1898

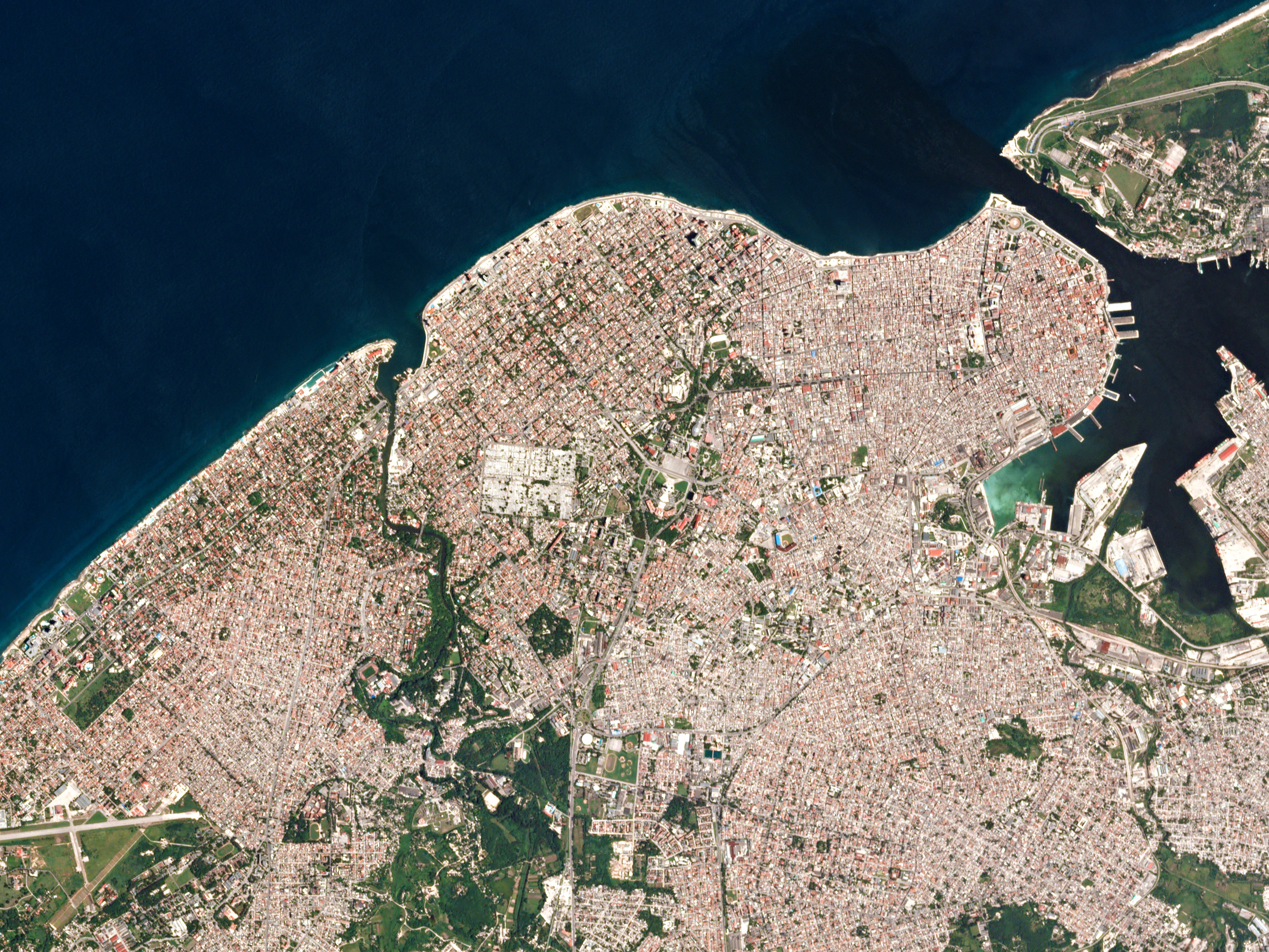
Map of Havana, 2016

- 1806 – Espada Cemetery
- 1810 – Hurricane.
- 1811 – Population: 94,023.
- 1813 – El Lucero de la Habana newspaper begins publication.
- 1817
  - Botanical Gardens established.
  - La Piña de Plata eatery in business.
- 1828 – El Templete built in the Plaza de Armas.
- 1832 – El Noticioso y Lucero de la Habana newspaper begins publication.
- 1834 – President's Palace built.
- 1835
  - Fernando VII aqueduct constructed.
  - Mercado de Cristina (market) built on Plaza Vieja.
- 1837 – Railway (Havana-Bejucal), Mercado de Cristina, and city jail constructed.
- 1838 – Teatro Tacón opens.
- 1840 – Plaza del Vapor
- 1841 – Population: 184,508.
- 1844
  - Liceo Artistico y Literario de la Habana (lyceum) founded.
  - Palacio de Aldama built.
- 1846 – Great Havana Hurricane.
- 1847 – Premiere of Bottesini's opera Cristoforo Colombo.
- 1853
  - Susini cigarette factory in operation.
  - Revista de la Habana literary magazine begins publication.
- 1854 – Colegio de Belén founded.
  - Plaza del Vapor, Havana
- 1856 – Hotel Inglaterra built.
- 1861 – Royal Academy of Medical, Physical, and Natural Sciences established.
- 1863
  - Fuente de la India (fountain) installed in Parque Central.
  - City walls dismantled.
- 1868
  - El Ansador Comercial begins publication.
  - Colon Cemetery inaugurated.
- 1871 – 27 November: Students executed.^{(es)}
- 1876 – Hotel Pasaje built.
- 1877
  - Villalba palace built.
  - Payret Theatre opens.
- 1878
  - Acueducto de Albear inaugurated.
  - City becomes part of La Habana Province.
- 1880 – Colegio de Abogados de La Habana (bar association) founded.
- 1881 – Jane Theater-Circus built.
- 1882 – School of arts and trades opens.
- 1884 – La Lucha newspaper begins publication.
- 1888 – La Discusion newspaper begins publication.
- 1889 – Population: 200,000.
- 1890 – Alhambra Theatre opens.
- 1894 – Manzana de Gómez built.
- 1898 – 15 February: United States Navy Ship Maine explosion.
- 1899
  - U.S. military occupation begins.
  - Population: 235,981.

== 20th century ==
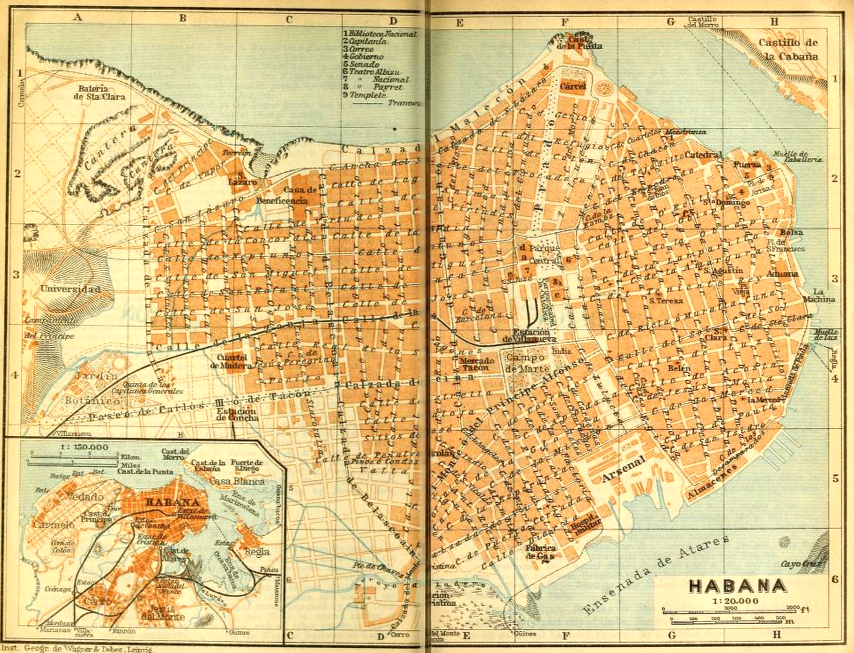
Map of Havana, 1909

=== 1900s–1940s ===
- 1901
  - Biblioteca Nacional José Martí (library) established.
  - Malecón (esplanade) construction begins.
- 1902
  - 20 May: U.S. occupation of Cuba ends. Republic of Cuba promulgated.
  - El Mundo and Tierra newspapers begin publication.
- 1905 – Petroleum refinery in operation.
- 1907
  - Palace of the Association of Store Clerks built.
  - Population: 297,159.
  - Sociedad de Ingenieros y Arquitectos de Cuba (engineering society) headquartered in city.
- 1908
  - Partido Independiente de Color (political party) founded in Havana.
  - Bohemia magazine begins publication.
  - Hotel Sevilla built.
- 1909 – Lonja del Comercio building (stock exchange) and Hotel Plaza constructed.
- 1910 – Pimp Alberto Yarini is killed in the San Isidro barrio of Old Havana.
- 1913
  - National Museum of Fine Arts of Havana founded.
  - El Heraldo de Cuba newspaper begins publication.
- 1917
  - Manzana de Gómez shopping arcade built.
  - Club Atenas organized.
- 1919
  - Florida West Indies Airways begins flights to/from Key West, USA.
  - Population: 363,506 city; 697,583 province.
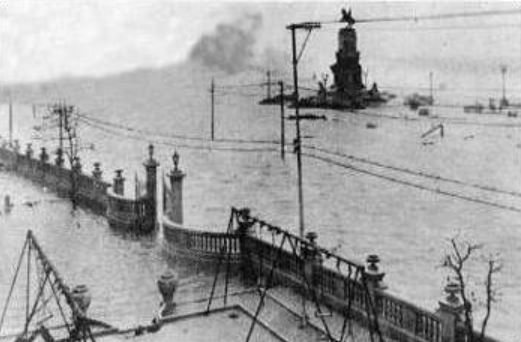
  - La Casa de Beneficencia y Maternidad during cyclone of 1919 with the statute of Antonio Maceo in the background.
- 1920
  - Museum of the Revolution (Presidential Palace before 1959) built.
  - Biblioteca Municipal (library) and Ruston Academy established.
- 1923 – Church of the Sacred Heart of Jesus built.
- 1925 Colegio de Belen, designed by Leonardo Morales y Pedroso is built.
- 1927 – Regina Theatre and Centro Asturiano open.
- 1928
  - January–February: Pan-American Conference held in Havana.
  - Parque de la Fraternidad Americana (park) and Teatro Auditorium inaugurated.
- 1929 – National Capitol Building constructed.
- 1930
  - Hotel Nacional de Cuba opens.
  - Rancho Boyeros Airport begins operating.
  - Bacardi Building constructed.
- 1934 – Orquesta de Cámara de La Habana (musical group) formed.
- 1938 – Office of the Historian of Havana created; Emilio Roig de Leuchsenring becomes city historian.
- 1939
  - Tropicana Club in business.
  - Cuban Baseball Hall of Fame inaugurated.
  - Lyceum and Lawn Tennis Club formed.
- 1945 – International Air Transport Association founded in Havana.
- 1946
  - Havana Conference held.
  - Manuel Fernandez Supervielle becomes mayor.
- 1947
  - Radiocentro CMQ Building
- 1948 – Cuban National Ballet founded.

=== 1950s–1990s ===
- 1952 – 1952 Cuban coup d'état
- 1953 – Iglesia de Jesús de Miramar (church) and Embassy of the United States built.
- 1954 – Cuban general election
- 1956 – FOCSA Building.
- 1957
  - 13 March: Presidential Palace Attack.
  - Supreme Court building constructed on Plaza Cívica.
  - Coliseo de la Ciudad Deportiva (arena) opens.
- 1958
  - November: Rafael Guas Inclán elected mayor.
  - José Martí Memorial erected in Plaza Cívica.
  - 1958 Cuban general election
  - Andrés Rivero Agüero is the last democratically elected president of Cuba under the 1940 Constitution.
- 1959
  - January: Revolutionary forces take city.
  - Instituto Nacional de Ahorro y Vivienda (housing agency) headquartered in Havana.
  - Plaza del Vapor demolished by the Castro government.
  - Plaza Cívica renamed "Plaza de la Revolución".
- 1960 – International Ballet Festival of Havana begins.
- 1961
  - Cuban Ministry of the Interior headquartered in Havana.
  - Instituto Tecnico Militar established.
- 1962 – Cuban National Ballet School established.
- 1963 – Cuban Journalists Union headquartered in Havana.
- 1964
  - Jaime Lucas Ortega y Alamino becomes Catholic archbishop of Havana.
  - Population: 940,700 city; 1,517,700 urban agglomeration.
- 1965
  - Palacio de la Revolución in use as headquarters of the Communist Party.
  - International School of Havana established.
- 1968 – Jardín botánico Nacional de Cuba (garden) established.
- 1970 – Population: 1,008,500 city; 1,751,216 urban agglomeration.
- 1971 – Danza Contemporanea de Cuba active.
- 1975 – December: 1st Congress of the Communist Party of Cuba held in Havana.
- 1976 – Arroyo Naranjo, Boyeros, Centro Habana, Cerro, Cotorro, Diez de Octubre, Guanabacoa, La Habana del Este, La Habana Vieja, La Lisa, Marianao, Playa, Plaza de la Revolución, Regla, San Miguel del Padrón administrative municipalities created.
- 1977 – Ministerio de Cultura de la República de Cuba's Editorial Letras Cubanas publishing house headquartered in Havana.
- 1978 – City hosts World Festival of Youth and Students.
- 1979
  - Havana Film Festival begins.
  - Palacio de las Convenciones built.
- 1982
  - Old Havana designated an UNESCO World Heritage Site.
  - Havana International Book Fair begins.
- 1983 – Centro de Investigaciones Psicológicas y Sociológicas headquartered in Havana.
- 1984 – Havana Biennial Art Exhibition begins.
- 1987
  - Grupo para el Desarrollo Integral de la Capital (urban planning group) formed.
  - Russian embassy built.
  - Instituto de Historia de Cuba headquartered in Havana.
- 1991
  - Estadio Panamericano (stadium) opens.
  - 1991 Pan American Games held in Havana.
- 1993 – Population: 2,175,888 city (estimate).
- 1994
  - August 1994 protest in Cuba.
  - Bán Rarra group active.
  - Meliá Cohiba Hotel in business.
- 1998 – January: Catholic Pope visits Havana.
- 1999 – Population: 2,189,716 city; 2,891,500 province.

== 21st century ==
- 2001 – Ballet Rakatan founded.
- 2003
  - Damas de Blanco protest begins.
  - Juan Contino Aslán becomes mayor.
- 2005 – December: World Trade Union Congress held in city.
- 2011
  - April: 6th Congress of the Communist Party of Cuba held in Havana.
  - Marta Hernández Romero becomes mayor.
- 2012 – Population: 2,105,291.
- 2014
  - Fábrica de Arte Cubano cultural space established.
  - Population: 2,121,871.
- 2015
  - January: United States–Cuban talks held in Havana.
  - September: Catholic pope visits city.
- 2016
  - March: U.S. president Obama visits Havana.
  - 7 April: Congress of the Communist Party of Cuba held in Havana.
- 2019
  - An EF4 tornado seriously damage the city and kills at least three.
  - Havana's celebrates its 500th anniversary of founding.
- 2022 – Hotel Saratoga explosion
- 2026 - Meteor hits the capital killing thousands

== See also ==
- History of Havana
- Timeline of Cuban history
- Timelines of other cities in Cuba: Camagüey, Cienfuegos, Guantánamo, Holguín, Matanzas, Santiago de Cuba

== Bibliography ==
=== Published in the 18th–19th century ===
in English

- Jedidiah Morse (1797), "Havannah", The American Gazetteer, Boston: S. Hall, and Thomas & Andrews
- R. H. Bonnycastle (1819). "Havannah". Spanish America. Philadelphia: A. Small.
- C. D. Tyng (1868), The Stranger in the Tropics: Being a Hand-book for Havana, New York: American News Co.
- George Henry Townsend (1877), "Havana", A Manual of Dates (5th ed.), London: Frederick Warne & Co., hdl:2027/wu.89097349427
- Charles Morris (1899), "Havana", Our Island Empire: a Hand-book of Cuba, Porto Rico, Hawaii, and the Philippine Islands, Philadelphia: J.B. Lippincott Company, OCLC 541085
- Abel Linares (1899). Cuba, an illustrated guide book on the island. Havana: Wilson's International Book Store.
- Jose de Olivares (1899), "Havana: the Key of the New Possessions", Our Islands and Their People as Seen with Camera and Pencil, vol. 1, USA: N.D. Thompson, pp. 19–32 – via Internet Archive
- Albert James Norton (1900), Norton's Complete Hand-book of Havana and Cuba, Chicago: Rand, McNally & Co., OCLC 4617287, OL 13488445M

in Spanish

- Ordenanzas municipales de la ciudad de La Habana (in Spanish). Imprenta del gobierno y capitania general. 1855.
- José María de la Torre (1857). Lo que fuimos y lo que somos, o, La Habana antiqua y moderna [Havana, Past and Present] (in Spanish). Spencer y Compania.
- Jacobo de la Pezuela (1863). "Habana: Historia". Diccionario geografico, estadístico, historico, de la isla de Cuba (in Spanish). Vol. 3. Madrid: Mellado. hdl:2027/uc1.32106019739058 – via HathiTrust. (chronology)
- "Profesiones de la Isla de Cuba: Provincia de la Habana", Directorio Hispano-Americano (in Spanish), Habana: Caine y Carricaburu, 1879, hdl:2027/uc1.31175012500693 – via HathiTrust
- Serafín Ramírez (1891). La Habana Artística: Apuntes Históricos (in Spanish). Habana: Capitania General.

=== Published in the 20th century ===
in English

- "Havana". Chambers's Encyclopaedia. London. 1901. hdl:2027/uc2.ark:/13960/t1fj2r624.
- José Toribio Medina (1904). La imprenta en La Habana (1707–1810) (in Spanish). Santiago de Chile: Imprenta Elzeviriana – via HathiTrust. (Annotated list of titles published in Havana, arranged chronologically)
- "Havana", The United States, with Excursions to Mexico, Cuba, Porto Rico, and Alaska (4th ed.), Leipzig: K. Baedeker, 1909
- Charles B. Reynolds (1909), "Havana", Standard Guide to Cuba, Havana: Foster & Reynolds, OCLC 21914222
- "Havana" . Encyclopædia Britannica. Vol. 13 (11th ed.). 1910. pp. 76–78.
- Benjamin Vincent (1910), "Havana", Haydn's Dictionary of Dates (25th ed.), London: Ward, Lock & Co., hdl:2027/loc.ark:/13960/t89g6g776 – via HathiTrust
- New York Public Library (1912). "Cuba: History and Description: Havana (City)". List of Works Relating to the West Indies. USA. pp. 170–74.
- J.W. Sanger (1919), "Publications in Habana", Advertising Methods in Cuba, Special Agents Series, Washington DC: United States Department of Commerce, pp. 226 v, hdl:2027/nyp.33433023652054
- U.S. Merchant Marine, Social Service Bureau (1920). "Havana, Cuba". Seaman's Handbook for Shore Leave (2nd ed.). Boston: Custom House.
- Walker Evans: Havana 1933. Thames and Hudson. 1989.
- Juliet Barclay (1993). Havana: Portrait of a City. Cassell Illustrated. ISBN 978-1-84403-127-6.
- Sergio Díaz-Briquets (1994). "Cuba". In Gerald Michael Greenfield (ed.). Latin American Urbanization: Historical Profiles of Major Cities. Greenwood Press. pp. 173–87. ISBN 0313259372. (Includes profile of Havana)
- Trudy Ring and Robert M. Salkin, ed. (1995). "Havana". Americas. International Dictionary of Historic Places. Routledge. pp. 279+. ISBN 978-1-134-25930-4.
- Jean-François Lejeune, John Beusterien and Narciso G. Menocal (1996). "The City as Landscape: Jean Claude Nicolas Forestier and the Great Urban Works of Havana, 1925–1930". Journal of Decorative and Propaganda Arts. 22. ISSN 2326-4632.
- Carlos Venegas Fornias, Narciso G. Menocal and Edward Shaw (1996). "Havana between Two Centuries". Journal of Decorative and Propaganda Arts.

in Spanish

- "Gremios de la Habana", Directorio mercantil de la Isla de Cuba (in Spanish), Habana: Imprenta 'Avisador Comercial', 1901, hdl:2027/nyp.33433016910840 – via HathiTrust + Directoria de las calles de la Habana (etc.)
- "Republica Cubana: Habana". Anuario del comercio, de la industria, de la magistratura y de la administracion de España, sus colonias, Cuba, Puerto-Rico y Filipinas, estados hispano-americanos y Portugal (in Spanish). Vol. 4. Madrid: Bailly-Bailliere e Hijos. 1908. pp. 14–220. hdl:2027/njp.32101065143677.
- Eusebio Leal Spengler (1988). La Habana, ciudad antigua (in Spanish). Editorial Letras Cubanas.

=== Published in the 21st century ===
in English

- Joseph L. Scarpaci; Roberto Segre [in Spanish]; Mario Coyula (2002). Havana: Two Faces of the Antillean Metropolis (Revised ed.). University of North Carolina Press. ISBN 0807827002.
- Joseph L. Scarpaci (2002). "Havana: the dynamics of local executive power". In David J. Myers; Henry A. Dietz (eds.). Capital City Politics in Latin America: Democratization and Empowerment. Lynne Rienner. ISBN 978-1-58826-040-6.
- Mario Coyula Cowley; Jill Hamberg (2003). "The Case of Havana, Cuba". Understanding Slums: Case Studies for the Global Report 2003. United Nations Human Settlements Programme and University College London. Archived from the original on 12 July 2018.
- Antoni Kapcia (2005). Havana: The Making of Cuban Culture. Bloomsbury. ISBN 978-1-85973-837-5.
- Luc J. A. Mougeot, ed. (2005). "(Havana)". Agropolis: The Social, Political, and Environmental Dimensions of Urban Agriculture. International Development Research Centre. ISBN 978-1-55250-186-3.
- Dick Cluster; Rafael Hernández (2006). The History of Havana. Palgrave Macmillan. ISBN 978-0-230-60397-4.
- Alfredo José Estrada (2007). Havana: Autobiography of a City. St. Martin's Press. ISBN 978-1-250-11466-2.
- Anke Birkenmaier; Esther Katheryn Whitfield, eds. (2011). Havana Beyond the Ruins: Cultural Mappings After 1989. Duke University Press. ISBN 9780822350521.
- Matthew J. Hill (2012). "Future of the Past: World Heritage, National Identity, and Urban Centrality in Late Socialist Cuba". In Marina Peterson; Gary McDonogh (eds.). Global Downtowns. City in the Twenty-First Century. University of Pennsylvania Press. ISBN 978-0-8122-0805-4.
- Adriana Premat (2012). Sowing change: the making of Havana's urban agriculture. Nashville: Vanderbilt University Press. ISBN 9780826518583.
- Michael J. Totten (Spring 2014), "The Last Communist City: a Visit to the Dystopian Havana that Tourists Never See", City Journal, New York
- Francisco Sùrez Viera (2014). "Port of Havana: The Gateway of Cuba (1850-1920)". In Miguel Bosa Suirez (ed.). Atlantic Ports and the First Globalisation c. 1850–1930. Palgrave Macmillan. ISBN 978-1-137-32798-7.
- Guadalupe Garcia (2015). Beyond the Walled City: Colonial Exclusion in Havana. University of California Press. ISBN 978-0-520-96137-1.
- Naomi Larsson (5 September 2016), "Havana's dirty truths", The Guardian, Cities
- Helen F. Wilson (2016). "Encountering Havana: texts, aesthetics and documentary encounters". In Jonathan Darling; Helen F. Wilson (eds.). Encountering the City: Urban Encounters from Accra to New York. Routledge. p. 203+. ISBN 978-1-317-14395-6.

in Spanish

- Leopoldo Fornés Bonavía (2003). Cuba, cronología: cinco siglos de historia, política y cultura (in Spanish). Madrid: Editorial Verbum. ISBN 978-84-7962-248-0. (chronology)
- Lilian B. Vizcaino Gonzalez (2003). "La Habana (Provincia/Ciudad)". In Louis A. Pérez; Rebecca Jarvis Scott (eds.). The Archives of Cuba: Los Archivos de Cuba (in Spanish). University of Pittsburgh Press. pp. 13–65. ISBN 0822941953.
- Gabino Ponce Herrero (2007). "Crisis, posmodernidad y planificación estratégica en La Habana" [Crisis, postmodernity and strategic planning in Havana]. Anales de Geografía (in Spanish). 27. Complutense University of Madrid. ISSN 1988-2378.
- Haroldo Dilla Alfonso [in Spanish] (2014). Ciudades en el Caribe: un estudio comparado de La Habana, San Juan, Santo Domingo y Miami (in Spanish). Mexico: Latin American Social Sciences Institute. ISBN 978-607-9275-36-5.
- Styliane Philippou (2014), "La Habana del siglo xix: 'Todo lo sólido se desvanece en el aire'" (PDF), Revista Quiroga (in Spanish), no. 5, ISSN 2254-7037 – via University of La Rioja, Dialnet (bibliographic database)
