= Timeline of Guantánamo =

The following is a timeline of the history of the city of Guantánamo, Cuba.

== 19th century ==
- 1741 - An English naval force landed here to attack Santiago.
- 1822 - Town established.
- 1856 - Ferrocarril de Guantánamo (railway) begins operating (approximate date).
- 1899
  - La Voz del Pueblo newspaper begins publication.
  - Population: 7,137 city; 28,063 district; 327,715 province.

== 20th century ==
- 1903 - U.S. military Guantanamo Bay Naval Base established near city.
- 1907 - Population: 14,559 city; 43,300 municipality; 455,086 province.
- 1919
  - Teatro Fausto built.
  - Population: 68,883.
- 1955 - Local MR-26-7 political group active.
- 1957 - Teatro Luisa opens.
- 1964 - Population: 122,400.
- 1998 - Roman Catholic Diocese of Guantánamo-Baracoa established.
- 1999 - Population: 208,030 city; 512,300 province.

== 21st century ==
- 2002 - U.S. military Guantanamo Bay detention camp established near city.
- 2014 - Population: 217,978.

== See also ==
- Guantánamo history (in Spanish)
- Timeline of Guantánamo Bay — Spanish, Cuban, & American events.
- Timelines of other cities in Cuba: Camagüey, Cienfuegos, Havana, Holguín, Matanzas, Santiago de Cuba

== Bibliography ==
in English

- "Guantánamo" . Encyclopædia Britannica. Vol. 12 (11th ed.). 1910.
- Clifford L. Staten (2005). "Timeline of Historical Events". History of Cuba. Palgrave Macmillan. ISBN 978-1-4039-6259-1.

in Spanish

- Jacobo de la Pezuela (1863). "Guantánamo (pueblo)". Diccionario geografico, estadístico, historico, de la isla de Cuba (in Spanish). Vol. 2. Madrid: Mellado. hdl:2027/uc1.32106019739041 – via HathiTrust.
- "Guantánamo". Diccionario enciclopédico hispano-americano de literatura, ciencias y artes (in Spanish). Vol. 9. Barcelona: Montaner y Simon. 1892. hdl:2027/mdp.35112203983301 – via HathiTrust.
- "Oriente: Guantanamo". Anuario del comercio, de la industria, de la magistratura y de la administracion de España, sus colonias, Cuba, Puerto-Rico y Filipinas, estados hispano-americanos y Portugal [Yearbook of Commerce, Industry, Judiciary and Administration of Spain, its Colonies Cuba, Puerto Rico and the Philippines, Spanish American States and Portugal] (in Spanish). Madrid: Bailly-Bailliere e Hijos. 1908.
- Olga Portuondo Zuniga (2003). "Guantánamo". In Louis A. Pérez; Rebecca Jarvis Scott (eds.). The Archives of Cuba: Los Archivos de Cuba (in Spanish). University of Pittsburgh Press. pp. 200–210. ISBN 0822941953. (fulltext)
- David Rubio Méndez (2016), "La comunidad emergente. Una aproximación a la realidad de los inmigrantes espontáneos no controlados en la Ciudad de Guantánamo" [The Emerging Community. An Approach to the Reality of Spontaneous Uncontrolled Immigrants in Guantanamo City], Estudios del Desarrollo Social: Cuba y América Latina (in Spanish), vol. 4, Latin American Social Sciences Institute, ISSN 2308-0132
