= Timeline of Holguín =

The following is a timeline of the history of the city of Holguín, Cuba.

== Prior to 20th century ==
- 1720-Settlement established (approximate date).Plaza de Armas (square) laid out.
- 1751 - Holguin becomes a city.
- 1752 - Jurisdicción de Holguín established.
- 1760 - Hospital de San Juan de Dios built.
- 1809 - San Jose Church built.
- 1820 - San Isidore Church built.
- 1868-October 30: City taken by rebel mambises at start of the Ten Years' War.
- 1872 - December 19: City taken by Cuban forces.
- 1893 - Railway begins operating between port of Gibara and Holguin.
- 1895 - El Eco de Holguin newspaper begins publication.
- 1899 - Population: 6,054 city; 34,506 district; 327,715 province.

== 20th century ==
- 1907 - Population: 7,592 city; 50,224 municipality; 455,086 province.
- 1916 - Statue of Calixto García erected in Parque Calixto Garcia.
- 1962 - Ahora newspaper begins publication.
- 1966 - Population: 91,000.
- 1970 - Population: 131,656.
- 1976 - Centro Universitario de Holguin and Instituto Superior Pedagogico de Holguin established.
- 1978 - Holguín Province and Jardín botánico de Holguín (garden) established.
- 1979 - Roman Catholic Diocese of Holguín established.
- 1986 - Ediciones Holguín (publisher) established.
- 1988 - El Chorro de Maita archaeological site excavated in Holguin Province.
- 1999 - Population: 259,300 city; 1,029,700 province.

== 21st century ==
- 2003 - Drought.
- 2004 - Construction of Parque de Los Tiempos (park) begins.
- 2014 - Population: 291,560.
- 2015 - September: Catholic pope visits Holguin.

== See also ==
- Holguin history (in Spanish)
- Timelines of other cities in Cuba: Camagüey, Cienfuegos, Guantánamo, Havana, Matanzas, Santiago de Cuba

== Bibliography ==
In English

- Ingram, Thomas Allan (1910). "Holguín" . Encyclopædia Britannica. Vol. 13 (11th ed.). p. 583.

In Spanish

- Jacobo de la Pezuela (1863). "Ciudad de San Isidoro de Holguin". Diccionario geografico, estadístico, historico, de la isla de Cuba (in Spanish). Vol. 3. Madrid: Mellado. hdl:2027/uc1.32106019739058 – via HathiTrust.
- Jacobo de la Pezuela (1871). "Descripcion de la Isla de Cuba: San Isidore de Holguin". Cronica de las Antillas (in Spanish). Madrid: Rubio, Grilo y Vitturi.
- Caine y Carricaburu, ed. (1879), "Profesiones de la Isla de Cuba: Provincia Santiago de Cuba: Holguin", Directorio Hispano-Americano (in Spanish), Havana: Imprenta del Directorio, hdl:2027/uc1.31175012500693 – via HathiTrust
- "Holguin". Diccionario enciclopédico hispano-americano de literatura, ciencias y artes (in Spanish). Vol. 10. Barcelona: Montaner y Simon. 1892. hdl:2027/mdp.35112203969698 – via HathiTrust.
- "Oriente: Holguin". Anuario del comercio, de la industria, de la magistratura y de la administracion de España, sus colonias, Cuba, Puerto-Rico y Filipinas, estados hispano-americanos y Portugal [Yearbook of Commerce, Industry, Judiciary and Administration of Spain, its Colonies Cuba, Puerto Rico and the Philippines, Spanish American States and Portugal] (in Spanish). Madrid: Bailly-Bailliere e Hijos. 1908.
- Leopoldo Fornés Bonavía (2003). Cuba, cronología: cinco siglos de historia, política y cultura (in Spanish). Madrid: Editorial Verbum. ISBN 978-84-7962-248-0. (chronology)
- José Vega Suñol (2003). "Holguin". In Louis A. Pérez; Rebecca Jarvis Scott (eds.). The Archives of Cuba: Los Archivos de Cuba (in Spanish). University of Pittsburgh Press. pp. 144–157. ISBN 0822941953. (fulltext)
