= Timeline of Matanzas =

The following is a timeline of the history of the city of Matanzas, Cuba.

== Before the 20th century, Part ==
- 3 - City laid out.
- 1694 - Ayuntamiento (town council) established.
- 1813 - Francisco Camero sets up first publishing business in Matanzas.
- 1815 - Mantanzas becomes the capital of its department.
- 1818 - Custom house built.
- 1835 - Public library established.
- 1844 - A volcano erupted and killed everyone on the island.
  - Gabriel de la Concepción Valdés executed
  - Hurricane occurs.
- 1846 - A Hurricane occurs.
- 1853 - William R. King takes the oath for Vice President of the United States in Matanzas.
- 1863 - Sauto Theater opens.
- 1870 - Hermitage of Montserrat established on a hill near the city.
- 1873 - Matanzas Baseball Club formed.
- 1880 - November: An international exhibition is held in Matanzas.
- 1884 - El Correo de Matanzas newspaper begins publication.
- 1892 - Population: 27,000.
- 1894 - El Club de Ciclistas de Matanzas active (bicycle club) (approximate date).
- 1899 - Population: 36,374.
- 1900 - El Heraldo Español newspaper begins publication.

== 20th century ==
- 1907 - Population: 36,009 city.
- 1912 - Roman Catholic Diocese of Matanzas established.
- 1916 - Teatro Velasco opens.
- 1919 - Population: 62,638.
- 1952 - Los Muñequitos de Matanzas rumba group formed.
- 1966 - Population: 81,000.
- 1968 - Archivo Historico Provincial de Matanzas (archives) established.
- 1976 - Centro Universitario de Matanzas and Instituto Superior Pedagogico de Matanzas established.
- 1978 - Jardín botánico de Matanzas (garden) established.
- 1984 - Population: 104,583 (estimate).
- 1999 - Population: 124,754.

== 21st century ==
- 2014 - Population: 136,486.

== See also ==
- Matanzas history
- Timelines of other cities in Cuba: Camagüey, Cienfuegos, Guantánamo, Havana, Holguín, Santiago de Cuba

== Bibliography ==
in English

- C. D. Tyng (1868), "Matanzas", The Stranger in the Tropics: Being a Hand-book for Havana and Guide Book for Travellers in Cuba, Puerto Rico and St. Thomas, New York: American News Co.
- "Matanzas" . Encyclopædia Britannica. Vol. 17 (11th ed.). 1910. p. 875.
- New York Public Library (1912). "Cuba: History and Description: Matanzas (City)". List of Works Relating to the West Indies. USA. pp. 174–175.
- Miguel A. Bretos (2011). Matanzas: The Cuba Nobody Knows. University Press of Florida. ISBN 978-0-8130-3810-0.

in Spanish

- D. José Garcia de Arboleya (1859). "Idea de las ciudades principales: San Carlos de Matanzas". Manual de la Isla de Cuba (in Spanish) (2nd ed.). Havana: Imprenta del Tiempo – via Google Books.
- Jacobo de la Pezuela (1863). "Matanzas". Diccionario geografico, estadístico, historico, de la isla de Cuba (in Spanish). Vol. 3. Madrid: Mellado. hdl:2027/uc1.32106005876096 – via HathiTrust.
- Domingo Figarola y Caneda (1881). Guía oficial de la Exposición de Matanzas (in Spanish). Matanzas: Impr. La Nacional – via HathiTrust.
- "Matanzas". Diccionario enciclopédico hispano-americano de literatura, ciencias y artes (in Spanish). Vol. 12. Barcelona: Montaner y Simon. 1893. hdl:2027/mdp.35112203969706 – via HathiTrust.
- "Matanzas", Directorio mercantil de la Isla de Cuba (in Spanish), Habana: Imprenta 'Avisador Comercial', 1901, hdl:2027/nyp.33433016910840 – via HathiTrust
- "Matanzas". Anuario del comercio, de la industria, de la magistratura y de la administracion de España, sus colonias, Cuba, Puerto-Rico y Filipinas, estados hispano-americanos y Portugal [Yearbook of Commerce, Industry, Judiciary and Administration of Spain, its Colonies Cuba, Puerto Rico and the Philippines, Spanish American States and Portugal] (in Spanish). Madrid: Bailly-Bailliere e Hijos. 1908.
- Adolfo Dollero (1919). La provincia de Matanzas y su evolución (in Spanish). Havana: Imp. Seoane y Fernández. hdl:2027/uc1.$c21524.
- Leopoldo Fornés Bonavía (2003). Cuba, cronología: cinco siglos de historia, política y cultura (in Spanish). Madrid: Editorial Verbum. ISBN 978-84-7962-248-0. (chronology)
- Alicia Santana García (2003). "Matanzas, del ideario a la realidad urbana". Revista Universidad de la Habana (in Spanish) (257). ISSN 0253-9276.
- Gabino la Rosa Corzo (2003). "Matanzas". In Louis A. Pérez; Rebecca Jarvis Scott (eds.). The Archives of Cuba: Los Archivos de Cuba (in Spanish). University of Pittsburgh Press. ISBN 0822941953. (fulltext)
- Odlanyer Hernández De Lara (2011). "Arqueologia urbana y patrimonio arqueologico en la ciudad de Matanzas, Cuba". Arquitectura y Urbanismo (in Spanish). 32 (1) – via Universidad Tecnológica de La Habana José Antonio Echeverría.
- Alicia Santana García (2011). "Julio Sagebien, arquitecto de Matanzas, ingeniero de Cuba". Arquitectura y Urbanismo (in Spanish). 32 (1) – via Universidad Tecnológica de La Habana José Antonio Echeverría.
