= Timeline of Cienfuegos =

The following is a timeline of the history of the city of Cienfuegos, Cuba.

== Prior to 20th century ==
- 1494 - Christopher Columbus visited Cienfuegos Bay.
- 1745 - Castillo de Jagua (fort) built.
- 1819
  - April 22: Fernandina de Jagua founded by Luis de Clouet in Spanish colonial Captaincy General of Cuba.
  - December: Population: 231.
- 1825 - Town "destroyed by a hurricane and rebuilt".
- 1829 - Town renamed "Villa de Cienfuegos."
- 1831 - Town coat of arms designed.
- 1833 - Our Lady of the Immaculate Conception Cathedral first completed.
- 1844 - Governor's house built.
- 1880 - Cienfuegos becomes a city.
- 1890 - Tomás Terry Theatre opens.
- 1892 - Population: 27,430.
- 1898
  - La Correspondencia newspaper begins publication.
  - Two vessels of the United States fleet under Admiral Schley blockaded the port.
- 1899 - Population: 30,038 city; 59,128 district; 356,536 province.

== 20th century ==
- 1901 - Jardín Botánico de Cienfuegos founded.
- 1903
  - Roman Catholic Diocese of Cienfuegos established.
  - Our Lady of the Immaculate Conception Cathedral became a cathedral.
- 1907 - Population: 30,100 city; 70,416 municipality.
- 1911 - Teatro Luisa opens.
- 1913 - Tivoli Gardens (theatre) opens.
- 1917 - Palacio de Valle (an historic villa) completed.
- 1919 - Population: 95,865.
- 1933 - Carlos Rafael Rodríguez becomes mayor.
- 1935 - Biblioteca Municipal (library) established.
- 1939 - Orquesta Aragón dance band formed.
- 1957
  - Political unrest.
  - Naval mutiny at Cienfuegos
- 1959 - Armed conflict between government and counterrevolutionaries begins.
- 1965 - Armed conflict between government and counterrevolutionaries ends.
- 1966 - Population: 89,000.
- 1976
  - November 2: Municipal election held, the first since 1959.
  - Cienfuegos Province established (previously part of Las Villas Province).
  - Archivo Histórico Provincial de Cienfuegos (archives) established.
- 1980 - Carlos Marx cement plant begins operating.
- 1983 - Juragua Nuclear Power Plant construction begins.
- 1984 - Population: 107,850 (estimate).
- 1999 - Population: 137,513 city; 395,100 province.

== 21st century ==
- 2005
  - July: Hurricane Dennis occurs.
  - Historic Centre of Cienfuegos designated an UNESCO World Heritage Site.
- 2014 - Population: 149,129.

== See also ==
- Cienfuegos history
- Timelines of other cities in Cuba: Camagüey, Guantánamo, Havana, Holguín, Matanzas, Santiago de Cuba

== Bibliography ==
in English

- "Cienfuegos" . Encyclopædia Britannica. Vol. 6 (11th ed.). 1910. p. 364.
- Cederlöf, Gustav (2019). "The Revolutionary City: Socialist Urbanisation and Nuclear Modernity in Cienfuegos, Cuba" (PDF). Journal of Latin American Studies. 52: 53–76. doi:10.1017/S0022216X19000920.
- Orlando F. García Martínez (2012), "Cienfuegos", in Alan West-Durán (ed.), Cuba, Charles Scribner's Sons, ISBN 978-0684316819

in Spanish

- Enrique Edo (1861). Memoria histórica de la villa de Cienfuegos y su jurisdicción (in Spanish). Cienfuegos: Imp. de "El Telégrafo" – via Biblioteca Digital Hispánica.
- "Cienfuegos". Diccionario enciclopédico hispano-americano de literatura, ciencias y artes (in Spanish). Vol. 5. Barcelona: Montaner y Simon. 1890. hdl:2027/mdp.35112203983400 – via HathiTrust.
- "Santa Clara: Cienfuegos". Anuario del comercio, de la industria, de la magistratura y de la administracion de España, sus colonias, Cuba, Puerto-Rico y Filipinas, estados hispano-americanos y Portugal [Yearbook of Commerce, Industry, Judiciary and Administration of Spain, its Colonies Cuba, Puerto Rico and the Philippines, Spanish American States and Portugal] (in Spanish). Madrid: Bailly-Bailliere e Hijos. 1908.
- Orlando F. García Martínez (1976). "Estudio de la economía cienfueguera desde la fundación de la Colonia Fernandina de Jagua hasta mediados del siglo XIX" [Study of Cienfuegos economy since the founding of the colony Fernandina de Jagua until the mid-nineteenth century]. Islas (in Spanish) (55–56). Santa Clara: Universidad Central de Las Villas: 117–170. ISSN 0047-1542.
- García Martínez, Orlando (2003). "Cienfuegos". In Louis A. Pérez; Rebecca Jarvis Scott (eds.). The Archives of Cuba: Los Archivos de Cuba (in Spanish). University of Pittsburgh Press. pp. 94–104. ISBN 0822941953. (fulltext)
- Orlando F. García Martínez (2007). "El alzamiento popular del 5 de septiembre de 1957 en Cienfuegos". Ariel: La revista cultural de Cienfuegos (in Spanish) (10). Dirección Provincial de Cultura de Cienfuegos. ISSN 1560-9375.
