= Saúl Delgado =

Cuban patriot

Saúl Delgado Duarte
- Born: 24 January 1926; Havana, Cuba
- Died: 19 May 1957 (aged 31); Cuba
- Cause of death: Execution by firing squad
- Organization: Revolutionary Insurrectionist Union (UIR)

Saúl Delgado Duarte (1926-1957) was a Cuban patriot; at just 31 years old, he was one of the victims of The Corynthia massacre, an event that is remembered in the history of Cuba.

== Biography ==
Saúl Rubén Delgado Duarte was born on January 24, 1926, in the City of Havana. Son of Homero Delgado Álamo, journalist and Isaís Duarte Ramos, teacher. He did his primary education at Nazareth College and continued when he was older at the Vedado Institute. He finally finished his studies in surveying.

== Revolutionary activities ==
He was the president of the Association of Students of the Vedado Institute, organizing student protests and as a leader he remained at the forefront of every student protest movement, without fearing the risks or consequences. He participated in the revolutionary organizations of his time such as the Revolutionary Insurrectionist Union (UIR), the Authentic Organization (OA) and Triple A (AAA). He also made contacts with elements of Orthodoxy. He fought tirelessly for the freedom of the prisoners of the coup d'état of March 10, 1952. He also participated in the attack on the Goicuría Barracks and the attack on a post at the Columbia Barracks.

From 1955, he started travelling abroad, the purpose of which was to bring arms into the country. This was done by pretending he was in car businesses. He traveled to Santo Domingo where he received rigorous training for 5 months in order to be able to participate in an armed expedition. He went back to Cuba to the eastern region and joined the movement led by Fidel Castro, who had already been in the Sierra Maestra for 4 months.

== Death ==
On May 19, 1957, at 9:00 p.m. they set sail for Cuba from the coasts of Florida in the United States, on the old-fashioned yacht Corynthia about 100 feet in length and 12 manga, under the command of Calixto Sánchez White, a former World War II combatant. The trip was a disaster since the yacht faced problems and there was bad weather, as the trip was extended more than scheduled they ran out of drinking water. They landed on May 23, 1957, along the coast of Canarita in Cabonico Bay, in the north of the then province of Oriente de Cuba. On May 28 they were located and agreed to surrender.

Once captured they were transferred in a truck and on the royal road known as The Naranjal de Cabonico and were killed with machine gun bursts, without respecting that they were prisoners of war. The next day the Army of Tyranny appeared at the scene of the murders dispersing the corpses to make them look like they had been killed in combat. After stripping them of their belongings, they were transferred to the Cabonico cemetery. The residents of the place dug their graves giving them burial.

He was killed in the Corynthia massacre in May 1957.
