= Timeline of Camagüey =

The following is a timeline of the history of the city of Camagüey, Cuba.

== Prior to 20th century ==
- 1528 - Santa María del Puerto Príncipe established by settlers relocating from Caonao, and previously from Punta del Guincho.
- 1599 - Convento de San Francisco founded.
- 1616 - Fire.
- 1617 - Cathedral first built.
- 1668 - City raided by Welsh pirate Henry Morgan.
- 1720 - San Francisco de Paula monastery rebuilt.
- 1723 - Santo Cristo del Buen Viaje church built.
- 1728 - Hospital de Caridad de San Juan de Dios established.
- 1730 - Hospital de Nuestra Senora del Carmen founded.
- 1733 - City Hall construction begins.
- 1737 - San Lázaro hospital built.
- 1741 - Epidemic outbreak.
- 1779 - Iglesia de Nuestra Señora de la Soledad (church) built.
- 1800 - Royal Audiencia of Santo Domingo (Spanish colonial supreme court) relocated to Puerto Principe from Santo Domingo.
- 1814 - Future poet Gertrudis Gómez de Avellaneda born in Puerto Principe.
- 1817 - Town becomes a city.
- 1842 - Filarmónica (music society) founded.
- 1850 - El Principal theatre opens.
- 1851 - Puerto Principe and Nuevitas Railroad begins operating.
- 1864
  - Benemérita Popular Santa Cecilia (music society) formed.
  - Our Lady of Candelaria Cathedral rebuilt.
- 1872 - Casino Español (music society) formed.
- 1874 - March: Battle of Las Guasimas (1874) fought; Cuban rebels win.
- 1886 - El Arrebol newspaper begins publication.
- 1898 -
  - Lope Recio Loynaz leading the third cavalry regiment makes a triumphal entry in the city, marking the end of the Cuban War of Independence for Camagūey,
  - Pedro Mendoza Guerra becomes governor of province.
- 1899
  - El Eco Mercantil newspaper begins publication.
  - Population: 25,102 city; 53,140 district; 88,234 province.

== 20th century ==
=== 1900s–1940s ===
- 1902 - El Camagüeyano newspaper begins publication.
- 1903
  - Porto Principe renamed "Camagüey."
  - City becomes seat of Camagüey Province.
- 1907 - Population: 29,616 city; 66,460 municipality; 118,269 province.
- 1912
  - Roman Catholic diocese of Camagüey established.
  - Ignacio Agramonte monument erected in Agramonte Park.
- 1913
  - Teatro Avellaneda opens.
  - Camagüey Jazz Band formed.
- 1919
  - Banda Municipal de Música formed.
  - Population: 98,193.
- 1932 - Hurricane.
- 1935 - Hurricane.
- 1938 - Biblioteca Municipal (library) established.
- 1948 - Cine Casablanca opens.

=== 1950s–1990s ===
- 1956 - El Cubano Libre student newspaper begins publication.
- 1959 - Huber Matos becomes governor of province.
- 1961 - Coro de Camagüey (musical group) formed.
- 1963 - Biblioteca provincial de Camagüey Julio Antonio Mella (library) established.
- 1964 - Population: 153,100.
- 1965 - Estadio Cándido González (stadium) built.
- 1966 - Population: 171,000.
- 1967
  - Universidad de Camagüey Ignacio Agramonte y Loynaz established.
  - Ballet de Camagüey founded.
- 1968 - Archivo Histórico provincial de Camagüey (archives) established.
- 1970 - Population: 197,720.
- 1976
  - Instituto Superior Pedagógico established.
  - Museo Estudiantil "Jesús Suárez Gayol" opens.
- 1981 - Instituto Superior de Ciencias Médicas de Camagüey established.
- 1983 - Festival de Teatro de Camagüey (theatre festival) begins.
- 1988 - Sister city relationship established with Madison, Wisconsin, USA.
- 1994 - Creole Choir of Cuba established.
- 1998
  - January: Catholic pope visits Camagüey.
  - Office of City Historian established.
- 1999 - Population: 306,049 city; 785,800 province.

== 21st century ==
- 2008
  - September: Hurricane Ike occurs.
  - Old town designated an UNESCO World Heritage Site.
  - Museo de San Juan de Dios (museum) opens.
- 2014 - Population: 304,027.

== See also ==
- Camagüey history
- Timelines of other cities in Cuba: Cienfuegos, Guantánamo, Havana, Holguín, Matanzas, Santiago de Cuba

== Bibliography ==
in English

- S.T. Armstrong (April 7, 1900). "Hospitals of Puerto Principe, Cuba". Philadelphia Medical Journal. 5.
- "Puerto Príncipe" . Encyclopædia Britannica. Vol. 22 (11th ed.). 1910. p. 634.
- New York Public Library (1912). "Cuba: History and Description: Puerto Principe (City)". List of Works Relating to the West Indies. USA. pp. 175–176.
- Sergio Díaz-Briquets (1994). "Cuba". In Gerald Michael Greenfield (ed.). Latin American Urbanization: Historical Profiles of Major Cities. Greenwood Press. pp. 173–187. ISBN 0313259372. (Includes profile of Camagüey)

in Spanish

- D. Jose Maria de la Torre (1845). Elementos de cronología universal y particular de España, Isla de Cuba y Puerto-Rico (in Spanish) (2nd ed.). Havana: Impr. del Gobierno y Capitanía General por S.M.
- Ordenanzas municipales de la ciudad de Puerto Principe (in Spanish). Imprenta del Fanal. 1856.
- Jacobo de la Pezuela (1866). "Ciudad de Santa Maria de Puerto-Principe". Diccionario geografico, estadístico, historico, de la isla de Cuba (in Spanish). Vol. 4. Madrid: Mellado. hdl:2027/uc1.32106005876096 – via HathiTrust.
- Tomás Pío Betancourt (1877). "Historia de Puerto-Principe". Los tres primeros historiadores de la isla de Cuba. Added title page title:Tres primeros historiadores de Cuba. Vol. 3. Havana. pp. 503–564. hdl:2027/uc1.b3613495.
- Jose Maria Abraido y Sarmiento (1882). Una villa de Espana y una ciudad de Cuba (in Spanish). Havana: J. Pulido y Comp.
- Juan Torres Lasqueti (1888). Coleccion de datos historicos-geograficos y estadisticos de Puerto del Príncipe y su jurisdicion (in Spanish). Havana: Impr. 'El Retiro'.
- P. Antonio Perpina (1889). El Camagüey: viajes pintorescos por el interior de Cuba y por sus costas, con descripciones del país [Camagüey: Scenic Travels Around Cuba and its Coast, with Descriptions of the Country] (in Spanish). Barcelona: J. A. Bastinos – via Internet Archive.
- "Puerto Principe". Diccionario enciclopédico hispano-americano de literatura, ciencias y artes (in Spanish). Vol. 16. Barcelona: Montaner y Simon. 1895. pp. 593–594. hdl:2027/mdp.35112203983426 – via HathiTrust.
- "Puerto Principe", Directorio mercantil de la Isla de Cuba (in Spanish), Habana: Imprenta 'Avisador Comercial', 1901, hdl:2027/nyp.33433016910840 – via HathiTrust
- "Camaguey". Anuario del comercio, de la industria, de la magistratura y de la administracion de España, sus colonias, Cuba, Puerto-Rico y Filipinas, estados hispano-americanos y Portugal [Yearbook of Commerce, Industry, Judiciary and Administration of Spain, its Colonies Cuba, Puerto Rico and the Philippines, Spanish American States and Portugal] (in Spanish). Madrid: Bailly-Bailliere e Hijos. 1908 – via Google Books.
- Jorge Juárez Cano (1929), Apuntes de Camagüey [Notes of Camagüey] (in Spanish)
- A. Pérez (1944), El Camagüey legendario [Legendary Camagüey] (in Spanish)
- "Camagüey, otra carga al machete", Cuba internacional (in Spanish), vol. 6, no. 56, Havana: Prensa Latina, 1974, ISSN 0011-2593
- Lourdes Gómez Consuegra (1989), Centro histórico de Camagüey [Historic Centre of Camagüey] (in Spanish)
- Lourdes Gómez Consuegra (1992), Centro histórico de Camagüey: Compendio de resultados [Historic Centre of Camagüey: Summary of results] (in Spanish)
- Roberto Segre (1998), "Camagüey o Santa Maria del Puerto Príncipe" [Camagüey or Santa Maria del Puerto Principe], AU (in Spanish), no. 4, Havana: Instituto Superior Politécnico José Antonio Echeverría, pp. 8–14, OCLC 173702610
- Cuadernos de Historia Principeña (in Spanish), Camaguey: Editorial Ácana, 2001, ISBN 959267065X. 2001-
- Leopoldo Fornés Bonavía (2003). Cuba, cronología: cinco siglos de historia, política y cultura (in Spanish). Madrid: Editorial Verbum. ISBN 978-84-7962-248-0. (chronology)
- Marcos Antonio Tamames Henderson (2002), "Símbolos republicanos en la ciudad de Camagey", AU: Arquitectura y urbanismo (in Spanish), vol. 23
- Gabino La Rosa Corzo (2003). "Camaguey". In Louis A. Pérez; Rebecca Jarvis Scott (eds.). The Archives of Cuba: Los Archivos de Cuba (in Spanish). University of Pittsburgh Press. pp. 118–132. ISBN 0822941953. (fulltext)
- Marcos Antonio Tamames Henderson (2005). La ciudad como texto cultural: Camagüey 1514-1837 (in Spanish). Camagüey: Ed. Ácana.
- Lourdes Gómez Consuegra (2009). "El Centro Histórico Urbano de Camagüey, Patrimonio Mundial. Planeamiento, gestión y manejo". Apuntes: Journal of Cultural Heritage Studies (in Spanish). 22 (2). Bogotá: Pontificia Universidad Javeriana. ISSN 1657-9763.
- Fulgencio Ramón Nodal-Reyes; Ramón Lemay Nodal-Laugart (2014). "Edición clandestina del periódico El Cubano Libre en Camagüey durante la lucha contra la dictadura batistiana" [Clandestine edition of the newspaper El Cubano Libre in Camagüey during the struggle against the Batista dictatorship]. Santiago (in Spanish) (133). University of Santiago de Cuba. ISSN 0581-653X.
- En torno a la música: del Príncipe a Camagüey [About Music: from Principe to Camaguey] (in Spanish), Oficina del Historiador de la ciudad de Camagüey, 2014, archived from the original on February 23, 2015
