= Timeline of Guantánamo Bay =

Noteworthy events of Guantánamo Bay.

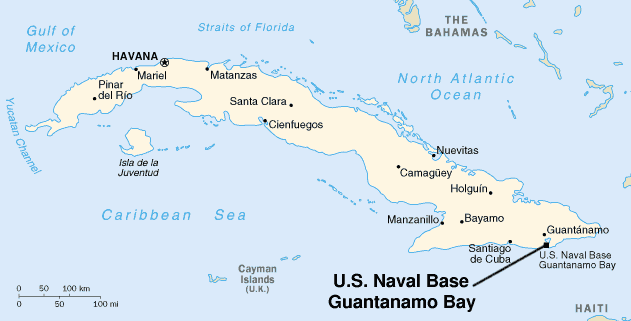
Map of Cuba with the location of Guantánamo Bay indicated

== Timeline ==
- 30 April 1494 – Christopher Columbus, on his second voyage of exploration, sailed into Guantánamo Bay and remained overnight. He called the bay "Puerto Grande".
- 18 July 1741 – Vice Admiral Edward Vernon, with 3,000 British troops under General Wentworth, arrived at Guantánamo Bay to begin an unsuccessful campaign to capture Santiago.
- December 1760 – Boats from the frigates HMS Trent and HMS Boreas cut-out the French privateers Vainquer and Mackau hiding in the bay. The French were also forced to burn another, the Guespe, to prevent her capture.
- 10 June 1898 – A battalion of Marines landed at Fisherman's Point and made camp on McCalla Hill, the first U.S. troops ashore in Cuba in the Spanish–American War.
- 23 February 1903 – President Theodore Roosevelt signed original lease agreement with Cuba for a naval base at Guantánamo Bay. See Platt Amendment.
- 3 March 1903 – U.S. Congress appropriated $100,000 for "necessary expenditures incident to the occupation and utilization of the naval station at Guantánamo, Cuba ..."
- 10 December 1903 – Cuba turned over the Naval Reservation to the United States.
- 27 April 1904 – An appropriation of $385,500 was made for an emergency repair installation at Guantánamo Bay, including a dry dock to be built on South Toro Cay.
- 1906 (exact date unknown) – Work on dry dock on South Toro Cay was discontinued.
- 29 September 1906 – Roosevelt sent U.S. troops to Cuba to crush a revolt, thus bringing about the second U.S. occupation of Cuba, which lasted until 1909.
- 1908 (Spring) – Station ship USS Monongahela burned.
- 10 March 1913 – LT John H. Towers (later Admiral and Chief of Bureau of Aeronautics) flew from Guantánamo Bay to Santiago in a Curtiss flying boat in 46 minutes.
- 10 December 1913 – The Naval Station was officially opened at its present location, the main activities having been moved from South Toro Cay.
- 1924 (Winter) – First concentration of Atlantic and Pacific Fleets in Caribbean.
- 7 August 1928 – Naval Station damaged by hurricane, whose center passed 50 miles (80.5 km) to the south.
- 1938 (late in year) – Hepburn Board visited Station and made recommendations for expansion.
- 20 February 1939 – President Franklin D. Roosevelt visited Guantánamo Bay in USS Houston.
- 1 July 1939 – Station started receiving water from pumping station at Yateras River via new pipeline.
- 4 December 1940 – President Roosevelt visited Guantánamo Bay in USS Tuscaloosa.
- 12 July 1940 – Contract signed with Frederick Snare Corporation to begin a vast construction program for build-up of the Station.
- 1 April 1941 – Naval Operating Base, Guantánamo Bay, Cuba, established.
- 25 February 1948 – President Harry S. Truman visited Base.
- 18 June 1952 – Title of Naval Operating Base changed to Naval Base.
- 8 June 1993 – US detention of HIV-positive refugees at Guantánamo Bay declared unconstitutional.

In addition to two presidents, many other distinguished people have visited the Naval Base. At one time General John J. Pershing was a visitor on board USS Utah. Charles A. Lindbergh was a visitor during his goodwill flight around the Americas in the "Spirit of St. Louis". Before and during the World War II years, visitors included: members of Congress, Cabinet officers, ambassadors, Harry Hopkins, Eleanor Roosevelt and others.

Other important visitors the base have included:

- U.S. Ambassador Robert Butler (from Havana), 21–22 December 1950
- Admiral and Mrs. Forrest P. Sherman, 31 December 1950 – 1 January 1951
- Vice Admiral R. V. Symonds-Tayler, RN, 8–15 January 1951
- Carlos Hevia, former President of Cuba and Cuban Minister without portfolio (graduate of U.S. Naval Academy, class of 1920) in 19 October 1951
- U.S. Ambassador and Mrs. Howard Travers (from Haiti), 4 December 1951 on two occasions subsequently
- Peruvian Minister of Marine Roque A. Saldias, 20–22 May 1952
- Cuban Minister of National Defense Nicolas Perez Hernandez 17 June 1952
- U.S. Ambassador and Mrs. Willard L. Beaulac (from Havana) 19–20 June 1952
- The Chief of Naval Operations, Admiral W. M. Fechteler, 18 December 1952.

== See also ==
- Cuba–United States relations
- History of Cuba
- Timeline of Cuban history
