= Timeline of Santiago de Cuba =

The following is a timeline of the history of the city of Santiago, Cuba.

== Prior to 20th century ==
- 1514 - August: Santiago de Cuba founded by Diego Velázquez de Cuéllar.
- 1518 - Roman Catholic diocese of Baracoa established.
- 1522
  - Capital of Cuba relocated to Santiago from Baracoa.
  - Coat of arms granted.
  - Santiago de Cuba Cathedral named as a cathedral by Pope Adrian VI.
- 1526 - Fire.
- 1535 - Fire.
- 1553 - Santiago was occupied and plundered by French corsairs.
- 1603 - Sacked by English pirates.
- 1607 - Capital of Cuba relocated from Santiago to Havana.
- 1613 - Fire.
- 1638 - Castillo de San Pedro de la Roca (fort) construction begins.
- 1662 - British military force from Jamaica occupied and plundered the town.
- 1722 - San Basilio el Magno seminary established.
- 1741 - A British squadron from Jamaica and operated unsuccessfully against Santiago.
- 1755 - Population: 15,471.
- 1767 - 11 June: Earthquake.
- 1774 - Population: 18,374.
- 1787 - Sociedad Económica de los Amigos del País founded.
- 1799 - Government slaves working at Cobre mine, Cuba were freed.
- 1805 - El Amigo de los Cubanos newspaper begins publication.
- 1808 - Population: 33,881.
- 1823 - Teatro Coliseo (theatre) opens.
- 1827 - Population: about 27,000.
- 1852 - Earthquake.
- 1862 - Lafayette tumba francesa group founded.
- 1868 - Santa Ifigenia Cemetery established.
- 1873 - The Virginius Affair.
- 1898
  - 3 July: Battle of Santiago de Cuba fought near city.
  - July: Siege of Santiago by US forces.
  - El Cubano Libre newspaper in publication.
  - Emilio Bacardí Moreau becomes mayor.
- 1899 - Public library established.

== 20th century ==
- 1902 - Population: 45,478.
- 1905 - Convención Bautista de Cuba Oriental (church) founded.
- 1909 - Vista Alegre Theatre built.
- 1915 - Cine Aguilera (cinema) opens.
- 1917 - Orientales baseball team formed.
- 1919 - Population: 70,232.
- 1924 - Cine Rialto (cinema) opens.
- 1943 - Population: 118,266.
- 1947 - University of Santiago de Cuba established.
- 1953
  - 26 July: Moncada Barracks attacked by forces of Castro, launching the Cuban Revolution.
  - Population: 163,237.
- 1954 - Antonio Maceo Airport opens.
- 1956 - 30 November: Levantamiento en Santiago de Cuba (anti-Batista event) occurs.
- 1957 - Anti-Batista unrest; crackdown.
- 1964 - Estadio Guillermón Moncada (stadium) opens.
- 1970 - Population: 277,600.
- 1976 - Jardín de los Helechos de Santiago de Cuba (garden) established.
- 1977 - Avispas baseball team formed.
- 1999 - Population: 441,524.

== 21st century ==
- 2012
  - March: Catholic pope visits Santiago.
  - October: Hurricane Sandy.
  - Population: 431,471.
- 2014 - Population: 434,268.
- 2015 - September: Catholic pope visits Santiago.

== See also ==
- Santiago de Cuba history
- List of governors of Provincia de Santiago de Cuba
- Timelines of other cities in Cuba: Camagüey, Cienfuegos, Guantánamo, Havana, Holguín, Matanzas

== Bibliography ==
=== in English ===
- "Spanish Colonies: Cuba: Santiago de Cuba". Commercial Directory of Latin America. Washington DC: Bureau of the American Republics. 1892.
- Ventura Fuentes (1908). "Cuba". Catholic Encyclopedia. New York. pp. 558–562.
- "Santiago de Cuba", The United States, with Excursions to Mexico, Cuba, Porto Rico, and Alaska (4th ed.), Leipzig: K. Baedeker, 1909
- "Santiago de Cuba" . Encyclopædia Britannica. Vol. 24 (11th ed.). 1910. pp. 192–193.
- New York Public Library (1912). "Cuba: History and Description: Special Places: Santiago de Cuba". List of Works Relating to the West Indies.
- "Cuba: Santiago de Cuba". Trade Directory of Central America and the West Indies. Washington DC: US Department of Commerce. 1915.
- Irene Aloha Wright (1918). Santiago de Cuba and its District (1607-1640). Madrid: Felipe Peña Cruz. hdl:2027/nyp.33433067340434.
- U.S. Merchant Marine, Social Service Bureau (1920). "Santiago de Cuba, Cuba". Seaman's Handbook for Shore Leave (2nd ed.). Boston: Custom House.
- Sergio Díaz-Briquets (1994). "Cuba". In Gerald Michael Greenfield (ed.). Latin American Urbanization: Historical Profiles of Major Cities. Greenwood Press. pp. 173–187. ISBN 0313259372. (Includes profile of Santiago)
- David F. Marley (2005), "Cuba: Santiago", Historic Cities of the Americas, USA: ABC-CLIO, p. 55+, ISBN 1576070271
- Clifford L. Staten (2005). "Timeline of Historical Events". History of Cuba. Palgrave Macmillan. ISBN 978-1-4039-6259-1.

=== in Spanish ===
- Emilio Bacardí Moreau (1908). Crónicas de Santiago de Cuba (in Spanish). Barcelona: Carbonell y Esteva. (3 volumes) (Includes chronology)
- "Republica Cubana: Oriente: Santiago de Cuba". Anuario del comercio, de la industria, de la magistratura y de la administracion de España, sus colonias, Cuba, Puerto-Rico y Filipinas, estados hispano-americanos y Portugal (in Spanish). Vol. 4. Madrid: Bailly-Bailliere e Hijos. 1908. pp. 271+. hdl:2027/njp.32101065143677.
- Leopoldo Fornés Bonavía (2003). Cuba, cronología: cinco siglos de historia, política y cultura (in Spanish). Madrid: Editorial Verbum. ISBN 978-84-7962-248-0. (chronology)
- Olga Portuondo Zuniga (2003). "Santiago de Cuba". In Louis A. Pérez; Rebecca Jarvis Scott (eds.). The Archives of Cuba: Los Archivos de Cuba (in Spanish). University of Pittsburgh Press. pp. 171–199. ISBN 0822941953. (fulltext)
