= Havana's International Book Fair =

Annual public festival to promote Cuban government sanctioned books

Havana's International Book Fair (Spanish: Feria Internacional del Libro de La Habana) is an annual public festival to promote books and writing that spans between February and March. The festival begins in Havana at the Fortaleza de San Carlos de la Cabaña, an 18th-century Spanish construction, and spreads east and west of the capital to all provinces and many municipalities. The book fair ends in the eastern city of Santiago de Cuba. The fair first took place in 1982, and occurred every two years until 2000 when it became an annual tradition. The festival consists of book vendors, poetry readings, children’s activities, art exhibitions, and concerts in the evenings. It is considered Cuba’s premier cultural event, as well as the event with the highest attendance in Havana. The 18th annual International Book Fair in 2009 had approximately 600,000 visitors.

Literacy in Cuba is one of the greatest legacies of the Cuban Revolution of 1959. The law that established the National Press of Cuba was one of the first measures of the revolution. In 1961, Cuba launched a National Literacy Campaign and today, according to the United Nations, Cuba has the highest literacy rate in the world. Along with the public, the book fair is attended by Cuban and international authors, publishers, and political officials. Over 100 publishing houses present catalogues of books, including Casa de las Américas. Each book fair is dedicated to a genre, issue, or author, and also a guest of honor. Since 2000, each book fair has been dedicated to Cuban authors and intellectuals that are sanctioned by Cuba's government.

Snapshots from XVI International Book Fair at Morro-Cabaña

Larger queues that Cuban people have to do to enter to Book Fair.

Book Fair main entrance.

Queues inside for purchase books.

Bridge pass between Morro and La Cabaña.

Most of books on sale in Cuban currency at the fair are about politics and ideology.

== List of Havana International Book Fairs ==
- 1982: First book fair. Held at the Fine Arts Palace (now the Museum of Fine Arts). Slogan "The Book: Bridge of friendship among the countries of the world." This slogan characterized the fair for some years.
- 2000: Ninth book fair. New site: San Carlos de La Cabaña. Slogan: To read is to grow. Dedicated to Cintio Vitier and to Italy.
- 2003: Twelfth book fair. Dedicated to Cuban writer Pablo Armando Fernández.
- 2017: Canada is guest of honor.

== See also ==
- Timeline of Havana

== Notes ==
- Terry González, Marta (2003). "Special Libraries and Other Information Providers in Cuba". World Libraries. 13 (1–2).
