= Mario Coyula Cowley =

Cuban architect (1935–2014)

- Born: 10 June 1935; El Vedado, Havana, Cuba
- Died: 14 June 2014 (aged 79); Havana, Cuba
- Occupation: Architect
- Known for: Parque de los Mártires Universitarios, Mausoleo de los Mártires del 13 de Marzo
- Children: Miguel Coyula

Mario Coyula Cowley (born in Havana June 16, 1935, died in Havana July 7, 2014) was a Cuban architect and architectural historian. He was an authority on the history and preservation of Havana.

Dr. Coyula served as a Robert F. Kennedy Visiting Professor from 2002-2003 at Harvard University in Urban Planning and Design. He was a full professor at the Faculty of Architecture of Havana from 1964, professor de Mérito (2001), National Award of Architecture (2001), National Habitat Award (2004), and Académico de Mérito (2011). He was director of the school of Architecture, of the City Department of Architecture and Urbanism, and of the Group for the Integrated Development of the Capital (GDIC) all from Havana. Dr. Coyula is also a member of several commissions, scientific councils and advisory councils. He is a co-author of the book Havana: Two Faces of the Antillean Metropolis (London and Chapel Hill: University of North Carolina, 2002) with Roberto Segre and Joseph L. Scarpaci, Jr. He had two sons and one daughter, Xavier Coyula Salsamendi, Mariana Coyula Salsamendi, and the filmmaker Miguel Coyula.
