= Grupo para el Desarrollo Integral de la Capital =

Cuban urban planning effort

- Formation: 1987
- Type: Urban planning
- Region served: Havana, Cuba

The Grupo para el Desarrollo Integral de la Capital (Group for the Integral Development of Havana) is an urban planning effort in Havana, Cuba, established in 1987. According to one scholar, it was "created to develop new ways of dealing with the problems created by three decades of neglect" of the city by the state.

== History ==
Participants have included architect Mario Coyula Cowley, among others. In 1988 the group began organizing "Talleres de Transformacion Integral del Barrio" (neighborhood transformation workshops) which devised plans for local development. The workshops involved local ward "consejos populares" (popular councils), and sometimes also advisors from Cuban government agencies or international entities.

== Bibliography ==
- "Ideas avanzadas para un desarrollo urbano sostenible y participativo en La Habana (Cuba)" [Progressive ideas for sustainable and participatory urban development in Havana (Cuba)], Ciudades para un Futuro más Sostenible: Buenas Prácticas (in Spanish), Superior Technical School of Architecture of Madrid, 1996
- Mario Coyula (2000), "Havana Always: Preserving the Soul of a City", DRCLAS News, Harvard University, David Rockefeller Center for Latin American Studies
- Coyula; et al. (2002), Hacia un nuevo tipo de comunidad en la Habana: los Talleres de Transformación Integral del Barrio (in Spanish)
