= Oriente Province =

Former province in Cuba

Coordinates: 20.306°N 76.078°W

Province of Oriente Provincia de Oriente
- Former subdivision of Cuba
- 1878–1976
- Coat of arms

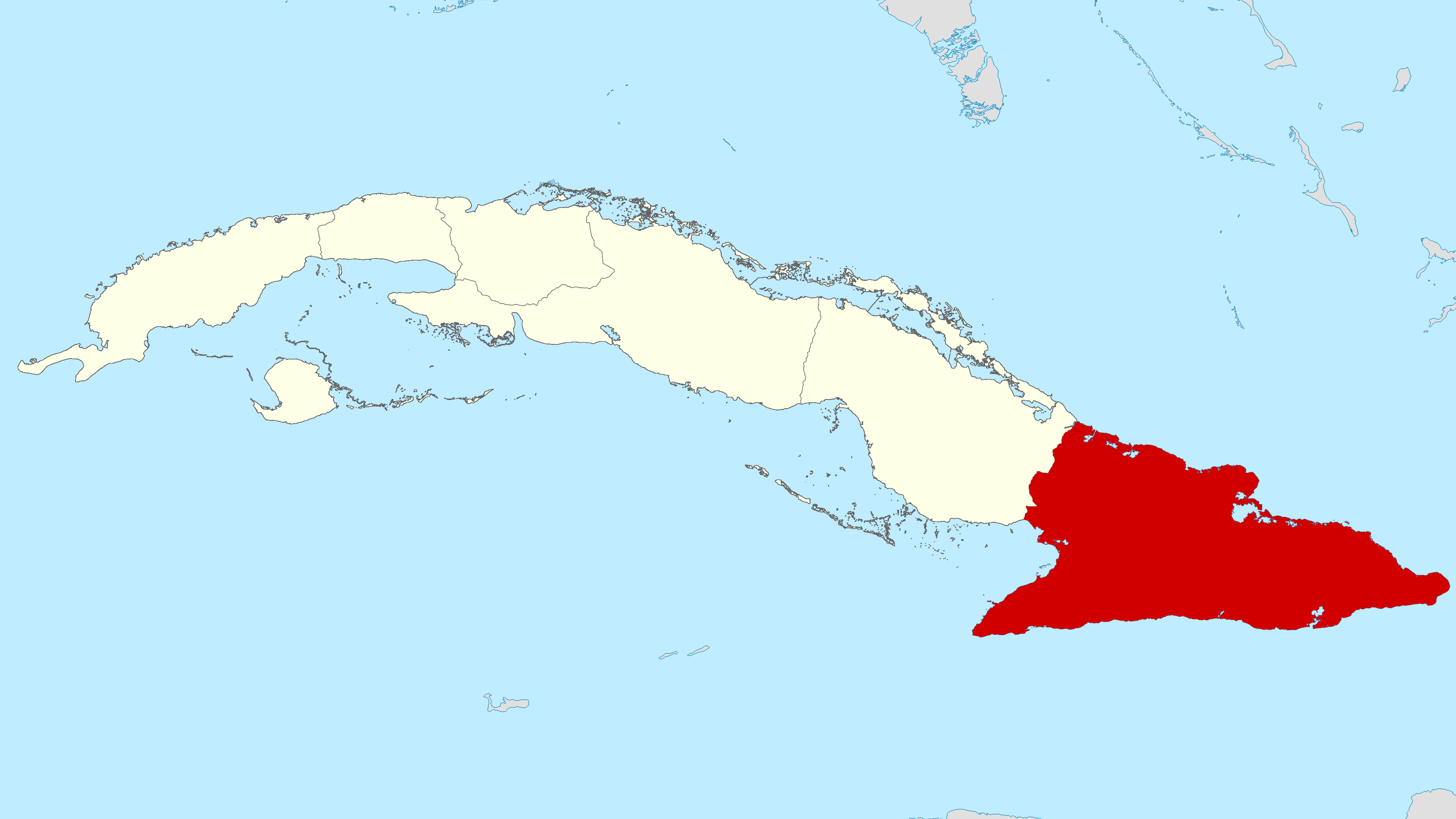
- Location of Oriente
- Capital: Santiago de Cuba
- Demonym: orientales
- Area
  - 2015: 14,641 km^{2} (5,653 sq mi)
- Population
  - 2015: 3,965,783
- History
  - Established: 1878
  - Disestablished: 1976

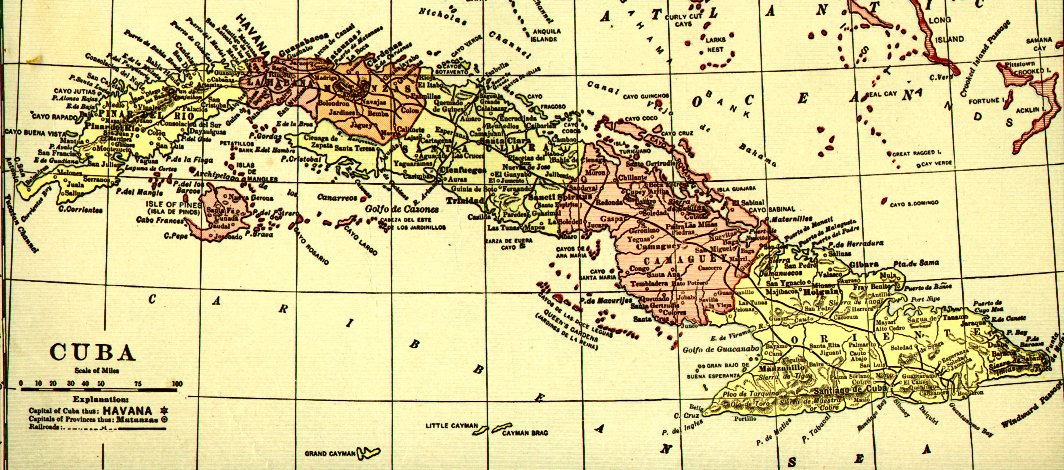
Cuba's provinces as shown on a 1910s map

Oriente ([oˈɾjente], "East") was the easternmost province of Cuba until 1976. The term "Oriente" is still used to refer to the eastern part of the country, which currently is divided into five different provinces.

The origins of Oriente lie in the 1607 division of Cuba into a western and eastern administration. The eastern part was governed from Santiago de Cuba and it was subordinate to the national government in Havana. In 1807, Cuba was divided into three departamentos: Occidental, Central and Oriental. This arrangement lasted until 1851, when the central department was merged back into the West. In 1878, Cuba was divided into six provinces. Oriente remained intact but was officially renamed to Santiago de Cuba Province until the name was reverted to Oriente in 1905. Fidel and Raúl Castro were born in a small town in Oriente province (Birán). The province was split in 1976 into five different provinces: Las Tunas Province, Granma Province, Holguín Province, Santiago de Cuba Province, and Guantánamo Province. This administrative change was proclaimed by Cuban Law Number 1304 of July 3, 1976, and remains in place to this day.

== History ==
Diego Velázquez de Cuéllar founded the capital of Oriente province in 1514 and named it Santiago de Cuba. The province comprises 22 municipalities and is Cuba's largest province containing about one third of the country's population. Oriente Province is in the most eastern region of Cuba with a population of 1,797,606. It stretches across 14,641 square miles (37,920 km^{2}) and consists of various mountain ranges with the Sierra Maestra region having Cuba's highest mountain peak and elevation in Pico Turquino. Oriente Province is the cradle of much of Cuba's history being the place of Fidel and Raúl Castro's birth. José Martí was killed in battle in Dos Ríos and many guerrilla wars have also taken place in Oriente. Cuba's first guerilla-style war was in 1523. against the advancing Spaniards in the Sierra Maestra Mountains. Some of Cuba's oldest cities are in Oriente Province (such as Baracoa) and carry a rich history of Cuba's struggle for independence and racial equality.

Throughout the 1800s a significant number of enslaved African people were brought to Cuba to work at the sugar mills, although some were brought from Haiti and other neighboring islands because they were also cheap and efficient labor. Open warfare broke out after an independence movement and lasted from 1867 to 1878. Slavery was finally abolished in 1886, but life for many Afro-Cubans remains a struggle, especially in Oriente Province.

After the occupation of the Spanish ended in 1899, Oriente Province became a refuge for Afro-Cubans. Oriente had the highest number of individual land owners and renters with 96% of the population being native-born. Afro-Cubans constituted as many as 26% of the land workers. Of the total land owned by Afro-Cubans, 75% were in Oriente Province. Even though Afro-Cubans fared better in Oriente, poverty was still rampant in the province and they remained oppressed by wealthy Cubans and foreign land owners.

Sugar and coffee were the main agricultural products produced. And at the highest there were forty-one sugar mills spread throughout the region. Foreign investors saw opportunity within the province and began to buy as much land as possible to increase sugar production. As investors bought land, local farmers were pushed out and frustration increased. Poverty grew and by May 1912 Cubans in Oriente Province had reached a boiling point. Massive demonstrations erupted and Afro-Cubans began to loot and burn businesses and property owned by foreign investors. In response, the Cuban government sent in the army to burn the property of the Afro-Cubans and slaughtered many. Within two years, half of the sugar mills in Oriente were owned by U.S. investors. For Cubans working within the province, life had become near unbearable. The presence of Americans, Jamaicans, Bahamians and Haitians, brought in by the United Fruit Company exacerbated racial problems not present until the U.S. occupation of 1898. Cuba's national hero, José Martí called for a multiracial republic.

== List of governors ==
=== 1500–1799 ===
- 1511 Diego Velázquez de Cuéllar
- 1528 Pedro de Barba
- 1532 Gonzalo Ñuño de Guzmán
- 1538 Juan de Rojas; Isabel de Bobadilla
- 1539 Hernando de Soto
- 1545 Juan de Avila
- 1547 Antonio de Chávez
- 1549 Gonzalo Pérez de Angulo
- 1550 Juan de Hinestrosa
- 1554 Diego de Mazariegos
- 1565 García Osorio
- 1567 Diego de Ribera y Cepero
- 1568 Francisco de Zayas; Pedro Menéndez de Airlés
- 1570 Pedro Vázquez Valdés
- 1571 Juan Alonso de Navia
- 1574 Sancho Pardo Osorio
- 1576 Gabriel de Montalvo
- 1577 Diego de Soto
- 1578 Juan Carreño
- 1580 Gaspar de Torres
- 1584 Gabriel Luján
- 1586 Pedro Vega de la Guerra
- 1589 Juan Tejada
- 1596 Juan Maldonado
- 1602 Pedro Valdés
- 1608 Juan de Villaverde Ozeta
- 1609 Juan Ortiz
- 1614 Juan García de Navia
- 1618 Rodrigo de Velazco
- 1625 Pedro Fonseca Betancourt
- 1627 Alonso Cabrera
- 1630 Juan Acevedo
- 1632 Juan de Amézqueta Quijano
- 1633 Pedro de la Roca y Borgés
- 1643 Bartolomé Osuna
- 1649 Diego Felipe Ribera
- 1654 Pedro Bayona Villanueva
- 1659 Pedro Morales
- 1662 Francisco de la Vega
- 1663 Juan Bravo Acuña
- 1664 Pedro Bayona Villanueva
- 1670 Andrés de Magaña
- 1678 Francisco de la Vega
- 1683 Gil Correoso Catalán
- 1688 Tomás Pizarro Cortés
- 1690 Juan Villalobos
- 1691 Alvaro Romero Venegas
- 1692 Sebastián Arencibia Isasi
- 1698 Mateo Palacio Saldurtum
- 1700 Juan, Barón de Chaves
- 1708 José Canales
- 1711 Luis Sañudo Asay
- 1712 Mateo de Cangas
- 1713 Carlos Sucre
- 1728 Juan del Hoyo; Pedro Ignacio Jiménez
- 1738 Francisco A Cagigal
- 1747 Lorenzo de Arcos y Moreno
- 1754 Lorenzo Madariaga
- 1765 Marqués de Casa Cagigal
- 1770 Esteban de Olaris
- 1772 Juan Antonio Ayauz de Ureta
- 1776 José Teutor
- 1779 Antonio de Salas
- 1781 Vicente Manuel de Céspedes
- 1782 Nicolás de Arredondo
- 1788 Juan Bautista Vaillant
- 1796 Juan Nepomuceno Quintana
- 1798 Isidoro de Limonta
- 1799 Sebastián Kindelán

=== 1800–1902 ===
- 1800 Pedro Alcántara de Urbina
- 1814 Pedro Celestino Duharte; Antonio Mozo de la Torre
- 1816 Eusebio Escudero
- 1821 Marqués de San Felipe y Santiago
- 1822 Juan de Moya; Gabriel de Torres y Velasco
- 1824 Juan de Moya
- 1825 Francisco de Yllas
- 1826 Juan de Moya; Isidro Barradas; Francisco de Yllas
- 1828 Juan de Moya
- 1830 Francisco de Yllas
- 1831 Juan de Moya
- 1834 José Santos de la Hera; Fernando Cacho
- 1835 Manuel Lorenzo
- 1837 Santiago Fortuns; Juan de Moya; Tomás Yarto
- 1839 Joaquín Escario; Pedro Becerra
- 1840 Juan Tello
- 1843 Cayetano Urbina
- 1846 Gregorio Piquero
- 1847 José Mac-Crohón
- 1851 Joaquín del Manzano
- 1852 Joaquín Martínez de Medinilla
- 1854 Marqués de España
- 1855 Carlos de Vargas Machuca
- 1859 Primo de Rivera
- 1860 Antonio López de Letona
- 1862 José Colubrí Massort
- 1863 José Ramón de la Gándara
- 1864 Casimiro de la Muela; Blas Villate de la Hera, Conde de Valmaseda
- 1865 Marqués de la Concordia; Juan de Ojeda; José del Villar y Flores
- 1866 Juan de Ojeda; José del Villar
- 1867 Juan de Ojeda; Ramón Vivanco y León; Joaquín Ravenet y Morantes
- 1868 Juan de Ojeda; Fructuoso García Muñoz
- 1869 Simón de la Torre y Orsuaza; Juan de Ojeda; Félix Ferrer y Mora; Blas Villate, Conde de Valmaseda
- 1870 Juan de Ojeda; Conde de Valmaseda; José Melero y Calvo; Zacarías González Goyeneche
- 1871 Carlos Palanca y Gutiérrez
- 1872 Arsenio Martínez de Campo; Luis Riquelme; Adolfo Morales de los Ríos
- 1873 Juan García Navarro; Sabas Marín; Adolfo Morales de los Ríos; Juan Nepomuceno Burriel
- 1874 Juan Nepomuceno Burriel
- 1875 Sabas Marín
- 1876 Ramón Menduiña
- 1877 José Sáenz de Tejada; Enrique Bargés y Pombo; Luis Prendergast y Gordón; Camilo Polavieja; Andrés González Muñoz
- 1878 Luis Daban y Ramírez de Arellano
- 1880 Luis M de Pando; Camilo Polavieja; Emilio March y García
- 1881 Camilo Polavieja; Emilio March y García
- 1885 Luis M de Pando; Antonio Molto y Díaz-Bario; Francisco Acosta Alvear
- 1887 Santos Pérez y Ruiz; Alvaro Suárez Valdés
- 1889 Luis Izquierdo Roldán; Andrés González Muñoz; Ramón Barrio y Ruiz Vidal
- 1890 Francisco Javier Obregón
- 1891 Andrés González Muñoz; Leopoldo Barrios Carrión
- 1892 Andrés González Muñoz; Francisco Rodríguez del Rey; José Blanco y González Calderón; Rafael Suero Marcoleta; Antonio Gálvez y González
- 1893 Rafael Suero Marcoleta; Agustín Bravo y Jóven; Enrique Capriles y Osuna
- 1895 Sebastián Kindelán y Griñau; Jorge Garrich y Allo; José Giménez y Moreno
- 1897 Carlos Denis y Trueba; Juan A Vinent y Kindelán; Federico Ordax y Avecilla; Enrique Capriles
- 1898 Francisco Oliveiros y Jiménez; Enrique Capriles; Leonardo Ros y Rodríguez; Leonardo Wood
- 1902 Samuel Whiteside

== Municipalities ==
Present day municipalities that were part of Oriente include:

== See also ==
- Timeline of Santiago de Cuba (city)

== Bibliography ==
- "Gobernadores de Santiago de Cuba". Guia de forasteros de la siempre fiel de Cuba [Guide for Strangers to Cuba] (in Spanish). Havana: Imprenta del Gobierno y capitanía general por S.M. 1866.
- Emilio Bacardí Moreau (1908). Crónicas de Santiago de Cuba (in Spanish). Barcelona: Carbonell y Esteva – via HathiTrust. (3 volumes)
- New York Public Library (1912). "Cuba: History and Description: Special Places: Santiago de Cuba (Province)". List of Works Relating to the West Indies.
- Olga Portuondo Zuniga (2003). "Santiago de Cuba". In Louis A. Pérez; Rebecca Jarvis Scott (eds.). The Archives of Cuba: Los Archivos de Cuba (in Spanish). University of Pittsburgh Press. pp. 171–199. ISBN 0822941953. (fulltext)
