= Diccionario enciclopédico hispano-americano de literatura, ciencias y artes =

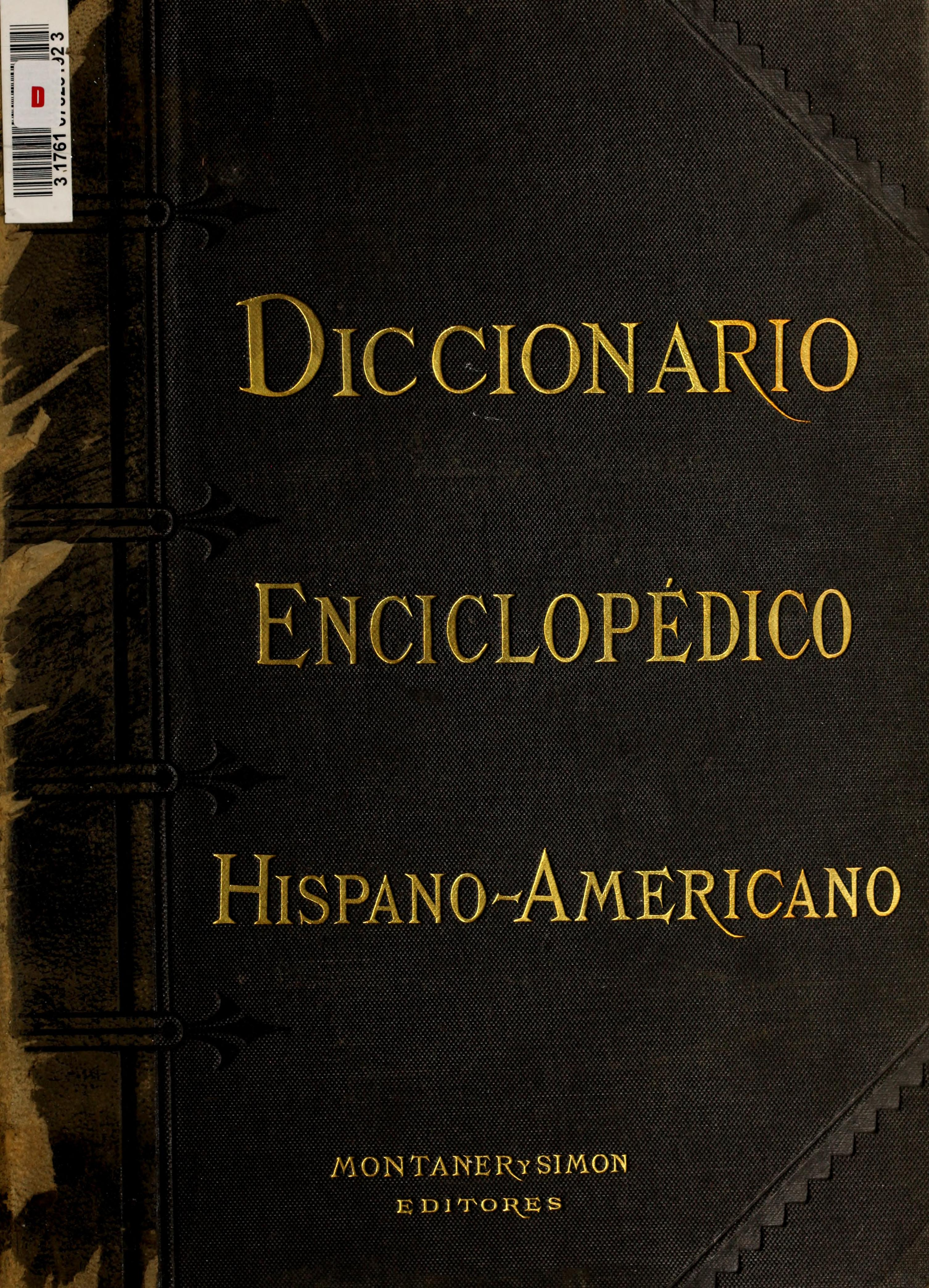
Book cover

The Diccionario enciclopédico hispano-americano de literatura, ciencias y artes (1887–99) was a Spanish language general encyclopedia produced by Montaner y Simón in Barcelona, Spain.
