= Rebecca J. Scott =

American historian

- Born: July 15, 1950 (age 76); Athens, Georgia, U.S.
- Spouse: Peter A. Railton (m. 1978)

Academic background
- Education: Radcliffe College (BA); London School of Economics (MPhil); Princeton University (PhD)

Academic work
- Institutions: University of Michigan

Rebecca Jarvis Scott (born July 18, 1950) is an American historian who is a Charles Gibson Distinguished University Professor of History and Professor of Law at the University of Michigan.

== Early life and education ==
Scott was born on July 18, 1950, in Athens, Georgia to parents Andrew and Anne Scott. She graduated from Radcliffe College with an A.B., from the London School of Economics with an M.Phil. in economic history and from Princeton University with a Ph.D.

== Career ==
After earning a MacArthur Fellowship in 1990, Scott joined the faculty at the University of Michigan (UMich) where she founded the Program in Latin American and Caribbean Studies. During this time, she co-wrote Beyond Slavery: Explorations of Race, Labor, and Citizenship in Postemancipation Societies with Frederick Cooper and Thomas C. Holt. The book explored the journey from slavery to freedom and how it impacted society. In 2002, Scott was promoted to the Charles Gibson Distinguished University Professor of History and Professor of Law at UMich and a member of the American Academy of Arts and Sciences.

In 2006, Scott's book Degrees of Freedom: Louisiana and Cuba after Slavery received the Frederick Douglass Book Prize for the best book on slavery or abolition. A few years later, she was appointed the University of Michigan's Henry Russel Lecturer, the university's highest honor for its senior faculty.

== Works ==
- Freedom Papers: An Atlantic Odyssey in the Age of Emancipation, Authors Rebecca J. Scott, Jean M Hébrard, Harvard University Press, 2012, ISBN 978-0-6740-4774-7
- Degrees of Freedom: Louisiana and Cuba after Slavery, Harvard University Press, 2005, ISBN 978-0-674-01932-4
- Societies after Slavery, Editors Rebecca J. Scott, Thomas C. Holt, Frederick Cooper, Aims Mcguinness, University of Pittsburgh Press, 2004, ISBN 978-0-8229-5848-2
- Slave Emancipation in Cuba: The Transition to Free Labor, University of Pittsburgh Press, 2000, ISBN 978-0-8229-5735-5
- Beyond Slavery, Authors Frederick Cooper, Thomas Cleveland Holt, Rebecca Jarvis Scott, UNC Press, 2000, ISBN 978-0-8078-4854-8
- "Exploring the Meaning of Freedom", The Abolition of slavery and the aftermath of emancipation in Brazil, Editor Rebecca Jarvis Scott, Duke University Press, 1988, ISBN 978-0-8223-0888-1
- "Beyond Comparison and Case Study", Cuban studies since the revolution, Editor Damián J. Fernández, University Press of Florida, 1992, ISBN 978-0-8130-1124-0
