= Cuban Bureau of Investigation =

Bureau of Investigation Buró de Investigaciones

Agency overview
- Formed: 1936
- Dissolved: 18 February 1959
- Superseding agency: Technical Investigation Department

Jurisdictional structure
- Operations jurisdiction: Republic of Cuba

Operational structure
- Headquarters: Havana
- Parent agency: National Police

The Bureau of Investigation (BI) (Spanish: Buró de Investigaciones) was a Bureau of the Republic of Cuba National Police from 1936 until its restructure into the Bureau of Revolutionary Investigations (BRI) and eventually the Department of Technical Investigations (DTI) by the Castro Regime. Cubans have given this bureau the nickname "The Dark Bureau."

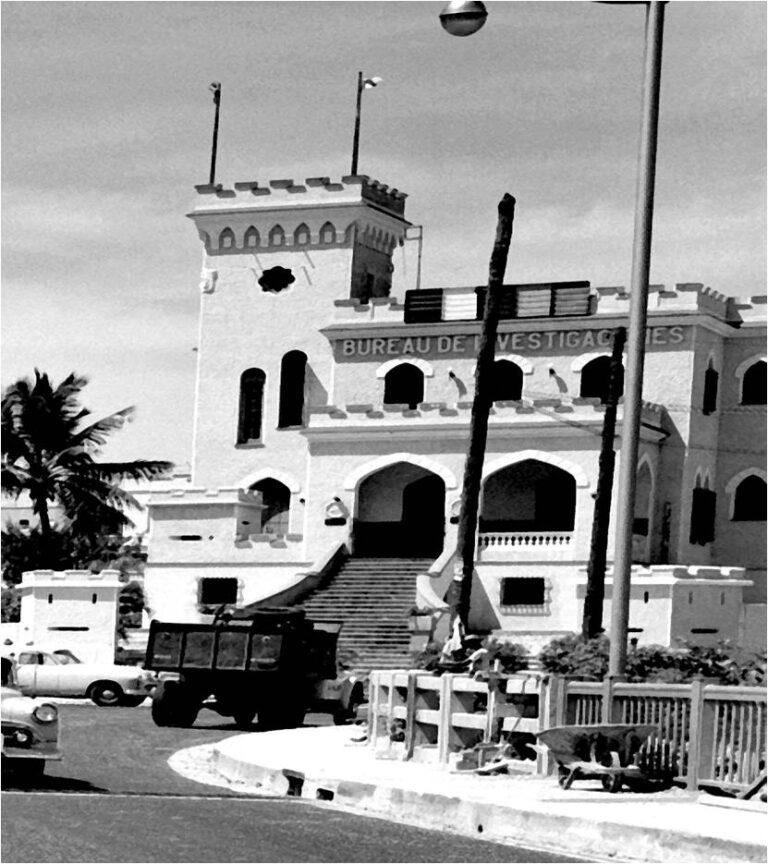
Headquarters of the Bureau of Investigation on 23rd Street in Vedado. This building was demolished by the Castro regime, and there is a park here now.

The BI had several departments;

- Homicide
- Immigration
- Narcotics Unit
- Robberies and Gambling
- Confidential Department 1 (Special interrogations)
- Confidential Department 2
- Confidential Department 3 (Phone tapping and monitoring)

Leadership of the Bureau was composed of a Bureau Chief, and Chiefs of the several departments.

In 1950, the Bureau Chief was Sigfredo Diaz Biart.

During the second Batista Presidency, Orlando Piedra was Bureau Chief.

Ricardo Medina was the Chief of Confidential Department 1 until Mariano Faget Diaz took over his duties, before becoming director of the Bureau for the Repression of Communist Activities (BRAC).

According to a 1958 Treasury Department report, The Bureau performed admirably in the investigation of illegal gambling at the Tropicana Club, the National Casino, and the Capri:

"The Cuban Bureau of Investigation has been mugging and printing the gamblers and the technicians and has practically completed the job. In the event the [FBI] desires copies of the pictures and prints same can be photostated and forwarded."

In the final year of US-Cuban relations, Adolfo Díaz Lorenzo was chief of the Narcotics Unit.

In April 1942, in Cuba during World War II, the Cuban Bureau of Investigation made 50 arrests for espionage.
