= Manuel Benitez Valdés =

Cuban National Chief of Police, Congressman, Senator, Exile, and Contract Assassin

Manuel Benitez Valdes
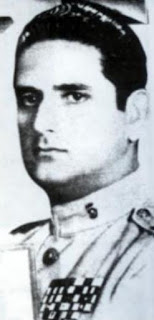
- Valdés in 1941

Aide-de-camp to Colonel Fulgencio Batista
- In office 1933–1941

National Chief of Police of the Republic of Cuba
- In office 1941–1944
- President: Fulgencio Batista
- Preceded by: Bernardo Garcia

Delegate to the Congress of Cuba
- In office 1948–1959
- President: Fulgencio Batista
- Prime Minister: Fulgencio Batista
- Offices held: Representative (1948 – 1955); Senator (1955 – 1959)

Personal details
- Born: September 26, 1910 Pinar del Rio, Cuba
- Died: January 6, 2003 (aged 92) Miami, United States
- Spouse: “Lolita” Ochoa Feijoo
- Parent: Manuel Benítez González
- Nickname(s): Nilo, El Bonito

Military service
- Rank: Brigadier General
- Unit: Sergeant's Coup
- Commands: Pinar del Rio Regiment
- Battles/wars: Cuban Revolution of 1933; Battle of the Hotel Nacional of Cuba; World War II; American Theatre; Cuba; La Capa Negra (The Black Cape); Cold War; Cuban Revolution

Manuel Benítez y Valdés was the Chief of the national police of the Republic of Cuba under President Fulgencio Batista. Valdés would often carry out Batista's orders with ruthless efficiency, being described as a "...rough, tough General...", and as "...one of the most nefarious men in the history of Cuba."

== Early life ==
Manuel Benítez was born in Pinar del Río, the son of Manuel Benítez y González, a former Machadista. Manuel Benítez Senior was born in Regla, near the capital Havana, and he was 14 years old when he joined the Cuban Liberation Army's invasion of western Cuba during the fight for independence from the Spanish Empire. After the end of Spanish rule, he worked as a journalist for the Havana newspaper La Discusión, and in 1903 he joined the Rural Guard with the rank of second lieutenant.

After the fall of Gerardo Machado, when he was already the colonel in charge of the 8th Regiment "Rius Rivera", from Pinar del Río, Manuel Benítez was dismissed from his command and, subject to investigation, interned in the La Cabaña military prison. There were no sanctions for the Machadistas and he released shortly afterward, joining the Liberal Party; being elected delegate to the Constituent Assembly of 1940. Elevated to the Senate of the Republic, he served as president of the Military Affairs Committee during World War II. He died in January 1946.

=== Life in Hollywood ===
Before he joined the Cuban army, Manuel Benítez was a supporting actor in several movies produced in Hollywood. Being described as having luck with women, he was nicknamed El Bonito – "The Handsome One" – and had sexual encounters with many early Hollywood actresses and other personalities.

== Sergeants' Revolt ==
In 1933, Manuel Benítez was a Second lieutenant in the Cuban National Army. According to himself, on September 4, 1933 he was arrested while sleeping at Camp Columbia and brought before Sergeant Fulgencio Batista. He listened to Batista address a meeting of enlisted soldiers. At the end of the speech, in a remarkable display of opportunism, and without hesitation, Benítez stood up from his seat, tore off his rank insignia, and proclaimed that he no longer wanted to be Lieutenant Benítez, but Sergeant Benítez. This, along with Tabernilla, Ferrer, and Querejeta, made him one of the few officers who joined the Sergeants' Revolt.

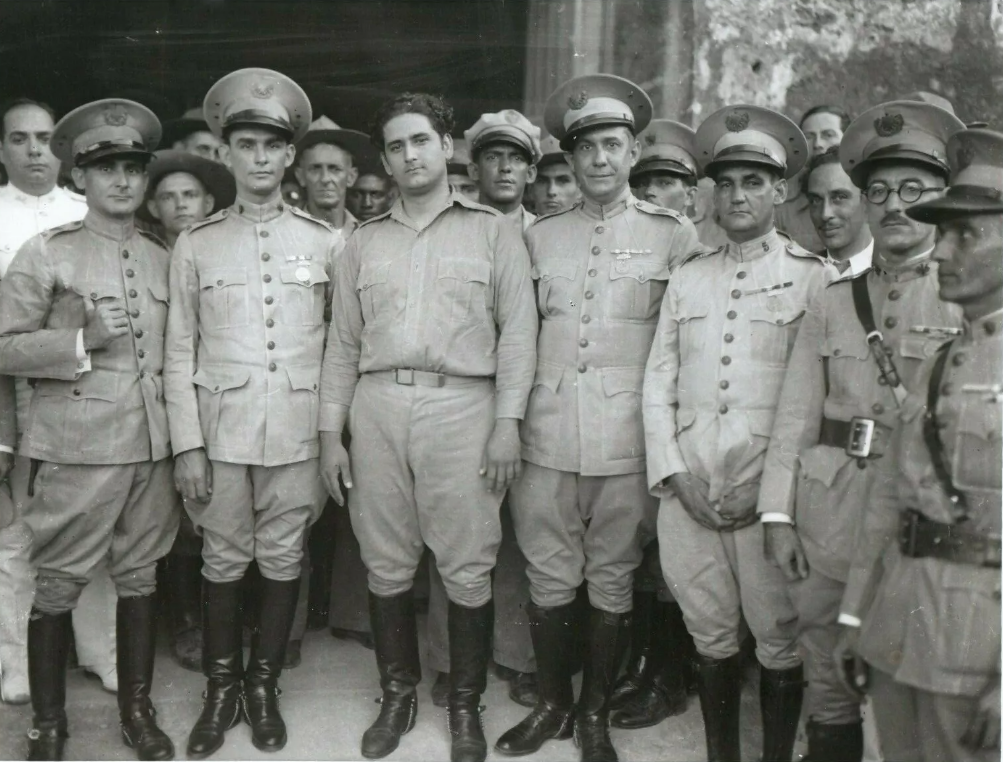
Colonel Manuel Benitez y Valdés, in center of photo not wearing a hat, posing with his regiment in Pinar del Rio, 1934.

Manuel Benítez then became Batista's aide and instigated Batista to order the bombing of the Hotel Nacional de Cuba in October 1933, without regard for the fact that officers who had been his comrades until recently were taking refuge there, in what developed into the Battle of the Hotel Nacional of Cuba. Benítez was also accused of having machine-gunned Lieutenant Colonel Mario Alfonso Hernández on Batista's orders.

Mario Alfonso Hernández, a member of the Revolutionary Junta of Columbia or Junta of the Eight (Spanish: Junta de los Ocho), who rose from private to lieutenant colonel in the revolution, dared to ask now Colonel Fulgencio Batista, who took over as head of the Army, about the date on which the Junta's agreement establishing the rotating leadership of the Armed Forces would begin to take effect. Batista didn't reply immediately, but said he would send the answer - which came in the form of Manuel Benítez. One night, he knocked on the door of Mario Alfonso's home, who, trusting him, let him in after recognizing his partner's voice. Benítez then riddled Alfonso with bullets right there in the living room, in front of his wife. Batista immediately issued a proclamation to the Army, in which Alfonso was falsely accused of drug trafficking.

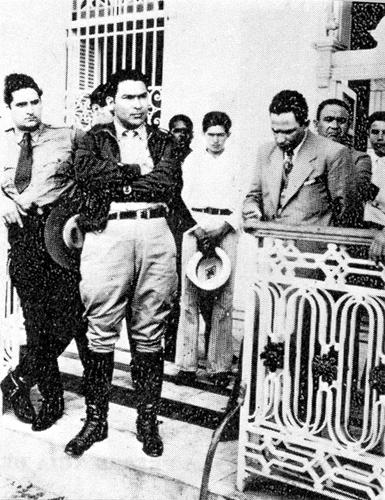
Colonel Manuel Benitez (left) and Fulgencio Batista (center) in Pinar del Río, 1936.

=== Complicated relationship with his father ===
As a result of Benitez's actions as a revolutionary, and after the success of the Sergeant's Coup in 1933, and the overthrow of Gerardo Machado, Benitez's father González - as Commander of the 8th Regiment of the Rural Guard - was dismissed from his command and imprisoned at La Cabaña. When he was released from prison, he joined the Liberal Party of Cuba.

Under the presidency of Federico Laredo Brú, González then served as the director general of Immigration, and was a welcome recipient of Jewish refugees from Europe. In 1939, González sold forged permits to German Jewish refugees for 150 dollars each, allowing them to enter the country for sanctuary and asylum.

However, certain people in the government did not appreciate this, and these forged permits were eventually denied entry into Cuba by the Cuban president. This scandal by the palace eventually forced the entire transatlantic ship MS St. Louis to return to Europe with over 900 Jews on board, after having been anchored in Havana for a full week. This is considered one of the darkest moments in Cuban-Jewish relations, and is known today as the "Voyage of the Damned."

González was later elected to the Constituent Assembly, where he signed the Cuban Constitution of 1940. He later became a Cuban Senator, and head of the Senate Defense Committee. González died in 1946.

== Chief of Police ==
=== Promotion to General and Chief of Police ===
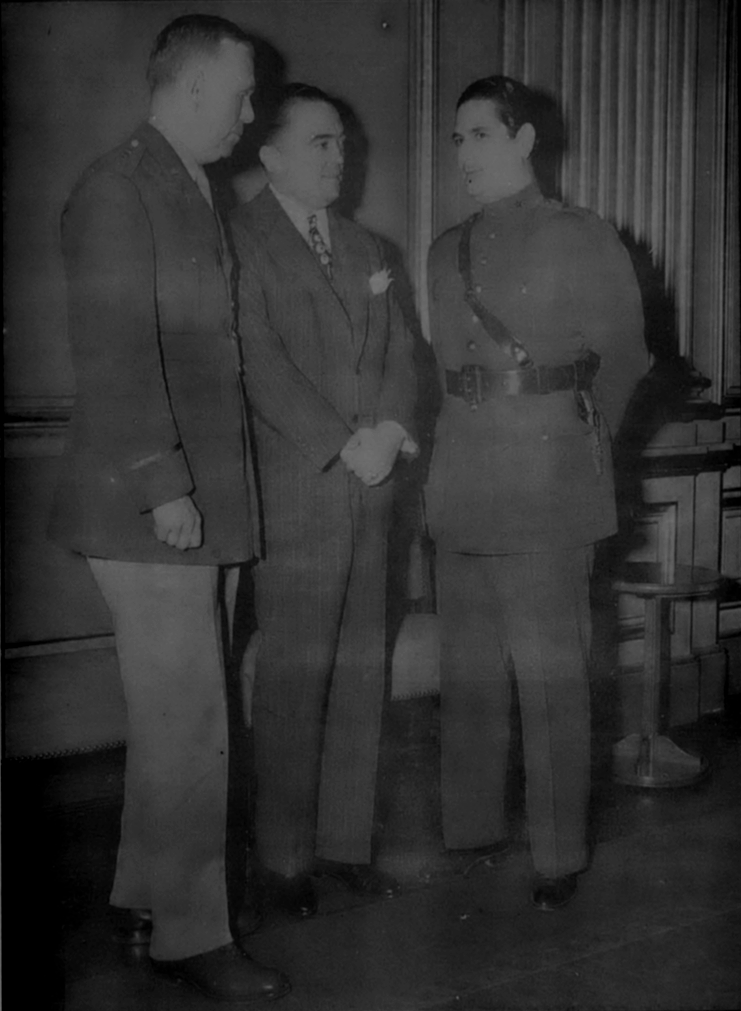
George C. Marshall, J. Edgar Hoover, and General Manuel Benitez in 1942.

Cuba entered in the World War II in December 1941. In January 1942 with Decree Law 7 (Organic Law of the Armed Forces), President Batista reestablished the rank of General in the Cuban National Army. Benitez became one of only four Generals in the entire army. In February 1941, Batista replaced the National Chief of Police Lt Col. Bernardo Garcia with Benitez, without consulting the head of the Army, Colonel José Eleuterio Pedraza.

This series of events created a major schism in the government, and resulted in an attempted coup by Colonel Pedraza, Chief García, and Captain Angel González (Head of the Navy of the Republic of Cuba). These men showed up at the Presidential Palace and demanded total control over military appointments and military affairs, accompanied by a large force of armed soldiers.

Batista told them that he would give them a reply soon.

Batista and Benitez showed up at their military headquarters in Camp Columbia soon after. Batista roused the troops there with a fiery oration and convinced the soldiers to turn on their commanders. Benitez arrested the three men and expelled them to Miami.

=== Corruption while in office ===
Benitez was notoriously corrupt as the Chief of Police. He profited from his relationship to the Illegal drug trade, illegal gambling, and prostitution.

The drug trade between Cuba and the United States was so bad in 1942 that the Federal Bureau of Narcotics (FBN) sent an agent named Claude Follmer to the country to liaise with the Cuban Commissioner of Drugs in the Ministry of Health, Eduardo Palacios Planas.

FBN Agent Follmer wrote of the situation at the end of 1942:

“As the result of inefficiency and corruption, past and present, in the national police, all of the vices known to modern civilization have prospered for many years in Cuba. At present, just as in the recent past, the major criminal conduct in Cuba revolves around assassination, gambling, prostitution, and an extensive traffic in marijuana and narcotic drugs.”

The FBN and its Commissioner Harry J. Anslinger were also keenly aware at this time that criminal narcotics trafficking syndicates like Unione Corse, the Sicilian Mafia, and gangsters like Lucky Luciano were using Cuba as a major distribution hub into the United States from Europe.

However, in 1943, Agent Follmer made FBN headquarters aware of a new source of Cuban narcotics trafficking:

"the Republic of Cuba is literally inundated with Peruvian cocaine, which in the case of Havana is sold to several thousand of the city’s cocaine addicts.”

The United States Ambassador to Cuba, Spruille Braden, wrote:

“Illicit dealings and corruption in all its forms are fully operative in Cuba and involve both low and high-level individuals. Even those in the president’s immediate circle, and some members of the cabinet . . . have a direct interest in the profits realized from such practices... Corruption has never before been so rampant, so organized, or so profitable for those at the top.”

Benitez also used his connections to ensure that the Tropicana Club remained open despite complaints of excessive noise and illegal gambling by the Colegio de Belén, which was run by the Jesuits.

Reportedly, Benitez made between $4,000,000 and $5,000,000 as the Chief of Police.

=== Hunting Nazis and the Abwehr ===
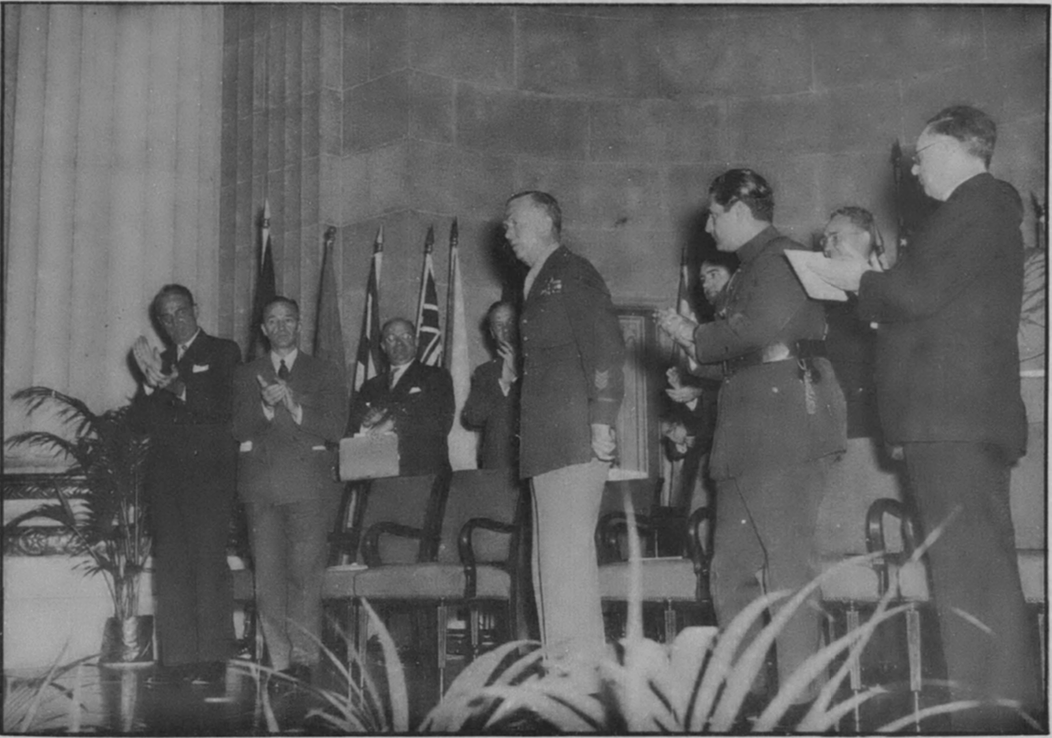
Benitez standing next to George C. Marshall as a guest speaker at the FBI Academy graduation in October, 1942. J. Edgar Hoover is not seen, but he is in the room. The FBI's Special Intelligence Service was the American agency responsible for hunting Nazis in Latin America during the War.

In Cuba during World War II, Benitez was responsible for the hunting of any Nazis and Abwehr agents in Cuba. He oversaw a notoriously violent young officer, Captain Mariano Faget, who ran the Servicio de Investigaciones de Actividades Enemigas (SIAE) or the "Office of the Investigation of Enemy Activities," dedicated to eliminating all Nazi influence in Cuba. This organization has been described as "the Cuban FBI."

This would eventually result in the capture and execution of Heinz Lüning, the only German spy executed on espionage charges in all of Latin America during World War II. This arrest led to the capture of the PYLREW espionage network in Chile, which was connected with Operation Bolívar.

In his memoirs, the SIS / OSS officer assigned to the SIAE, Ian Maxwell, writes of his first encounter with Benitez:

"General Manuel Benitez Valdes was a tall man for a Cuban; he was considered very handsome, and he, personally, showed that he did not disagree with this; he had been in some three or four Hollywood-made movies, two of them westerns; and he was considered quite a swordsman, where the ladies were concerned.

He was shocked to think that I had come, loaded with dictionaries, ready for work on my first day in the S.I.A.E.

He said;

"Senior Ian, first we must make a credential for you; next, you must learn something of good eating and drinking places in La Habana; and, next, you must see and try some, at least one, of our Cuban girls. Then, after you are acclimatized to La Habana, you can bring your dictionaries and we will assign you to Principe Prison and let you interrogate Germans all day, every day." He then added, "I can tell you how to learn Spanish very rapidly – that is, get a sleeping dictionary and have her teach you! That is how I learned my English!"

His English was so poor and so heavily accented and his vocabulary so limited that I did not know whether he meant this as a serious recommendation; but, the General was so conceited that he did not realize that his English was bad; and he was so girl crazy that he would recommend sleeping with a girl for any difficulties a man might encounter. He thought a sleeping doctpra was good for a cold; a sleeping dictionary was excellent for learning Spanish; and a sleeping beauty was just good!

...I was disappointed to learn that I would not be assigned to Capitan Faget – but, instead, that I would work directly under the Director himself."

=== First period of exile, (1944-1948) ===
In October 1944, Ramón Grau returned to power as President of Cuba, and former President Batista went into exile in Miami. Benitez also fled to Miami to avoid prosecution by Grau's government.

However, historian Irwin Gellman writes that Benitez was forced to leave Cuba by Batista, whom Benitez had publicly denounced as a traitor, because he had allowed Grau to win the election.

In 1946, Grau allowed Benitez to return to Cuba to visit his father who was terminally ill from chronic kidney failure, complicated by liver and heart problems.

Later in 1946, Benitez joined La Capa Negra (The Black Cloak), which was a failed attempted assassination and coup attempt against Grau. Other failed conspiracies with the same aim include the Cepillo de Dientes (Toothbrush), and the Mulo Muerto (Dead Mule).

As part of The Black Cloak, Benitez was the leader of a failed beach landing at Pinar del Río Province. He attempted to recruit his former regiment to revolt against Grau, but this attempt failed.

=== Election to public office ===
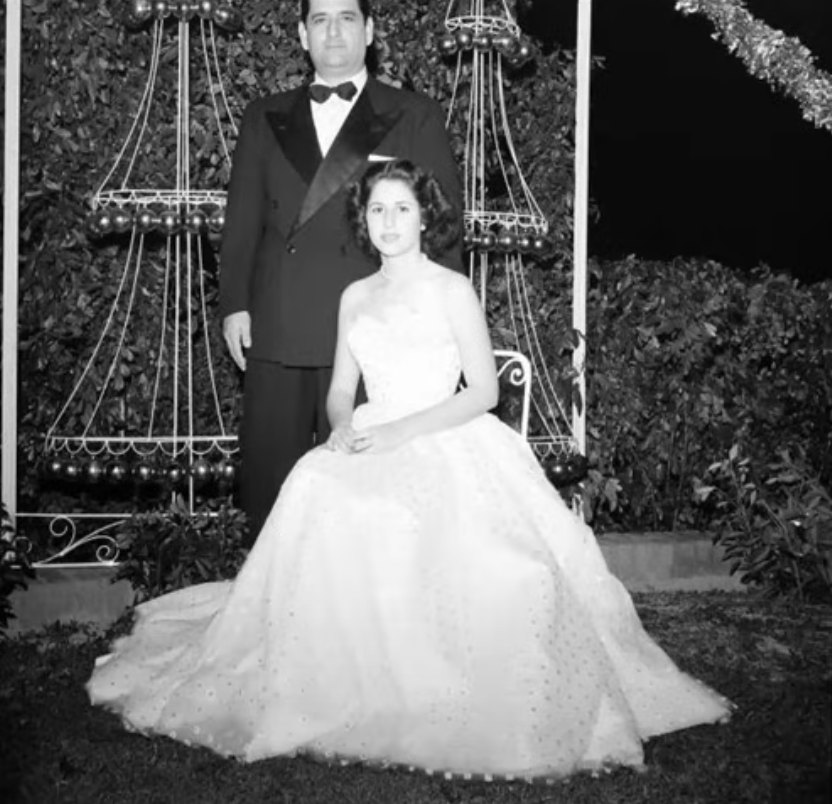
Manuel Benítez and his daughter Dolores Benítez at her Quinceañera.

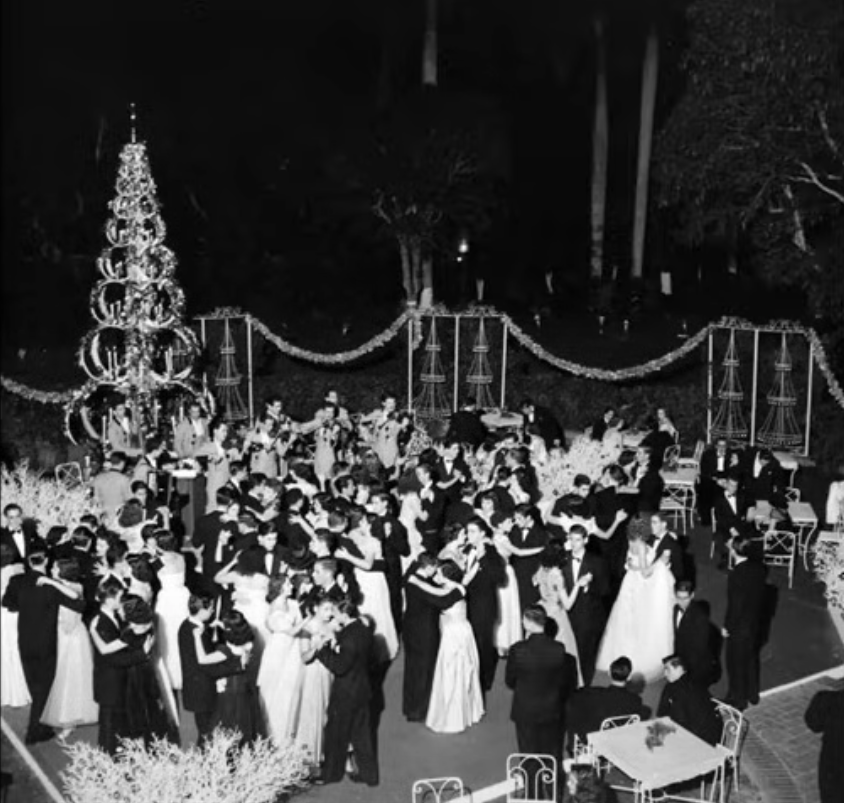
Dolores Benítez's Quinceañera - held at the Benítez household in Havana in 1950 costed approximately $50,000.

In 1948, Grau was succeeded as president by Carlos Prío Socarrás. Later in 1948, Benitez was elected as a delegate to the Chamber of Representatives in the Congress of Cuba, representing the Liberal Party of Cuba (PL).

In 1952, Batista ousted the President Prío and assumed full dictatorial powers of Cuba, becoming both President and Prime Minister.

Benitez served as a Representative until 1955, when he switched political parties and became a senator.

In 1954, Benitez was elected to the Cuban Senate in the Partido Auténtico (PRC) - strangely, this was the party that had been led by his greatest political rival, Grau.

== Permanent exile ==
In 1959, Fidel Castro successfully led the Cuban Revolution to overthrow Batista and install a Communist government. Benitez became exiled permanently, trading his time between Santo Domingo and Miami Benitez also spent time in other locations in the Caribbean region, including Mexico.

In the 1960s, Benitez was hired by François Duvalier (Papa Doc) to assassinate someone close to Paul Magloire. The target died of natural causes, but Benitez was able to convince Papa Doc that he had accomplished his mission through a slow acting poison, and received $50,000 for the contract.

Benitez was described by the Central Intelligence Agency WAVE station in Santo Domingo at this time as a longtime contact with KUBARK.

CIA officer W.H. Carley, stationed in Santo Domingo at the time, wrote of Benitez:

"Benitez has long and checkered background. Repeatedly characterized as indiscreet, unscrupulous and unreliable. He was considered one of worst gangsters around Batista in Cuba."

Benitez also spent a lot of time in Miami, as leader of the Government in Exile movement. In 1961, his group approached Governor C. Farris Bryant to seek zoning permission to establish a Cuban residential and industrial zone in Fort Lauderdale. In 1985, he lost the election for mayor of Miami, and later founded a radio station.

In 1968, Manuel Benítez wrote the book Peligro: subversión en América: un nuevo estilo de guerra (Danger: Subversion in America: A New Style of Warfare) that analyzes the Marxist-Leninist threat and insurgency in Latin America. It describes a "subversive war" focused on political and psychological warfare to gain popular support, rather than on military confrontations. The text describes how this new style of warfare uses social discontent in underdeveloped regions to generate violence and resentment, transforming local conflicts into low-intensity wars.

== Works ==
- Benítez Valdés, Manuel (1968). Peligro: subversión en América: un nuevo estilo de guerra [Danger: Subversion in America: A New Style of Warfare] (in Spanish). Mexico City: Editorial Meridiano. p. 256. OCLC 38806515.

== Bibliography ==
- Yániz, Esteban; Manuel, Alburquerque; J. Hernández, Manuel de (1943). Bajo el Mando del General Benítez [Under the Command of General Benítez] (in Spanish). Havana: Editora nacional, S.A. p. 184. OCLC 55798815.
