= Mariano Faget Diaz =

Cuban counterintelligence police officer and Nazi hunter

Mariano Faget
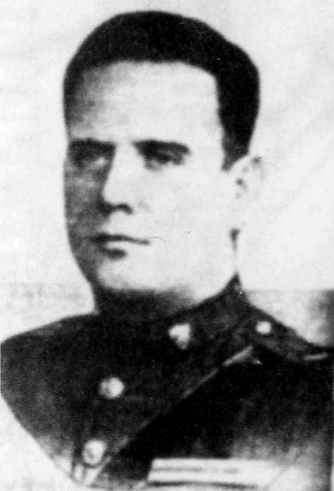

Director of the Enemy Activities Investigation Service
- In office 1940–1944
- President: Fulgencio Batista
- Succeeded by: Mario Salabarria

Deputy Director of the Bureau of Investigation
- In office 1954–1956
- President: Fulgencio Batista
- Preceded by: Ricardo Medina

Director of the Bureau for the Repression of Communist Activities
- In office 1956–1958
- Preceded by: José de Jesús Castaño

Personal details
- Born: September 9, 1904 Holguin, Cuba
- Died: May 29, 1972 (aged 67) Miami, United States
- Spouse: Elena Faget
- Children: Mariano Faget Jr.

Military service
- Rank: Colonel
- Battles/wars: World War II; American Theatre; Cuba during World War II; Cold War; Cuban Revolution

Mariano Faget y Diaz was a Cuban secret police commander and counterintelligence officer for over twenty years in the Republic of Cuba. Faget was the director of the Enemy Activities Investigation Service (SIAE), where he was responsible for hunting Nazis and Abwehr agents in the Republic of Cuba during World War II. With the rise of the Cold War, Faget was made Director of the Bureau for the Repression of Communist Activities (BRAC). He is regarded by many Cuban and American historians today as one of the most violent anticommunist police officers in Cuban history, but also its most shrewd and intelligent Nazi hunter.

Ironically, Faget's son—also named Mariano Faget—was arrested by the United States in 2000 on charges of espionage for the very communist regime that Faget fought so hard against in the 1950s. The junior Faget denied these charges.

== Early life ==
Faget was born on September 9, 1904, in Holguín, Cuba. He earned a degree from St. John's College in New York City. After graduating university, Faget returned to Cuba and was employed at several sugarcane mills throughout Cuba.

== Career as federal police officer ==
In 1931, Faget joined the Interior Ministry police of the Republic of Cuba. After the Cuban Revolution of 1933, Faget remained in the police force, and continued to rise through the ranks.

=== Nazi hunter ===
In 1940, with World War II looming, Fulgencio Batista appointed Faget to become the director of the newly created Enemy Activities Investigation Service (SIAE). This organization has been called "the Cuban FBI." Faget quickly gained a reputation as being a shrewd and intelligent counterintelligence investigator of anyone he suspected of having ties to Nazi Germany (and their fascist allies in the government of Francisco Franco) or the Empire of Japan. Thomas D. Schoonover writes that Faget at this time did not have a reputation for brutality.

In 1942, President Batista replaced the National Chief of Police Bernardo Garcia with General Manuel Benitez, Batista's former Aide-de-camp. Faget, as the chief Cuban Nazi hunter was now under the leadership of Benitez.

Faget was also the chief Cuban investigator into the case of Abwehr officer Heinz Lüning, who became the only German spy executed in all of Latin America on espionage charges during World War II. This arrest led to the capture of the PYLREW espionage network in Chile, which was connected with Operation Bolívar.

The Office of Strategic Services (OSS) liaison to Cuba during the war, Ian Maxwell, writes of Faget:

"...I met Capitan Mariano Faget, Chief of Operations of the S.I.A.E. He was as serious as General Benitez Valdes was frivolous; and he worked many hours each day and into the night, possibly to make up for the fact that his Director worked very few hours. Faget was effective against the Germans, their allies, the Spaniards, and against individuals who worked for, or sympathized with the German Nazis."

=== First period of exile (1944 - 1954) ===
In 1944, Faget fled to Miami after President Batista lost to Ramón Grau. Faget's successor as Director of the SIAE during Grau's tenure was Mario Salabarria. In Miami, Faget became an architectural designer of single-family homes. Faget's wife, Elena Faget, became pregnant at this time. When Elena was nine months pregnant, she returned to the family doctor in Havana to give birth in Santos Suarez and returned after one month to Miami with Faget's son, Mariano Faget Jr.

=== Deputy Director of the Bureau of Investigation ===
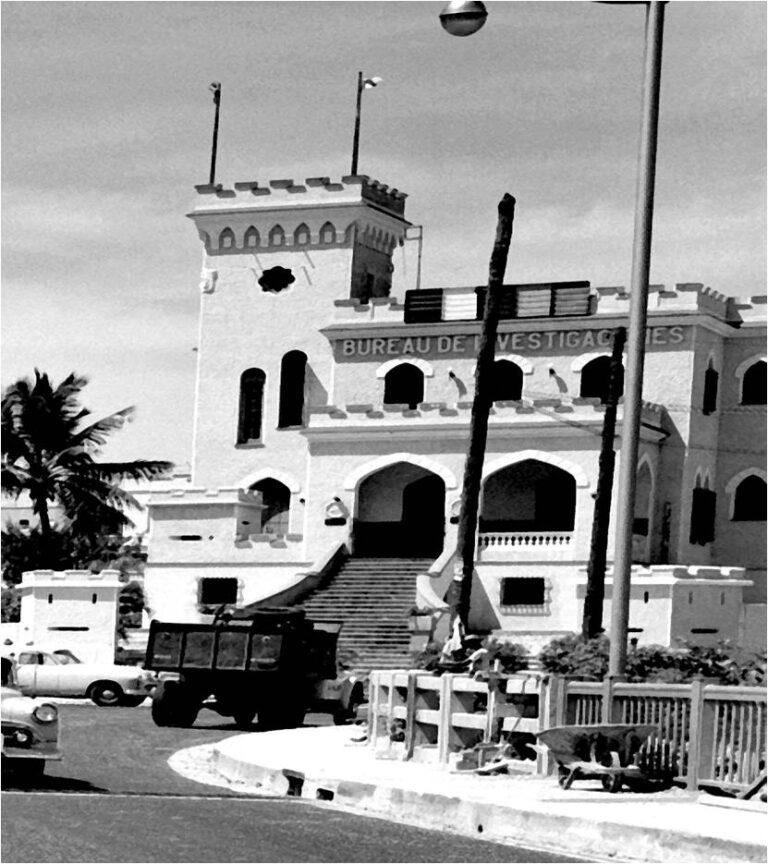
Headquarters of the Bureau of Investigation on 23rd Street in Vedado. This building was demolished by the Castro regime, and there is a park here now. According to Bohemia magazine, the park is full of "flamboyant trees."

In March 1952, Cuban president Prío was overthrown and Batista became the strong man. Sometime during Batista's reign, Faget was made a deputy director and second in command of the Cuban Bureau of Investigation (BI). This was known by many as the "Dark Bureau." He was second in command of the organization.

The BI had been established in 1934, and had several departments;

- Homicide
- Immigration
- Drugs
- Robberies and Gambling
- Confidential Department 1 (Special interrogations)
- Confidential Department 3 (Phone tapping and monitoring)

According to Bohemia Magazine, Faget was in charge of Confidential Department 3. The Director of BI was Orlando Piedra.

=== Director of BRAC ===
In 1956, during the Cuban Revolution, Faget became the director of the newly established Bureau for the Repression of Communist Activities (BRAC). Colonel Faget became in this role the chief police official responsible for hunting communists in Cuba, to include members of the 26th of July Movement.

Carlos Franqui, who was interrogated by Faget's BRAC, described Faget as:

"...a technician of torture. A scientist of the North American school: continuous blows on the head, leaving no marks, but producing tremendous pain and tension. To my inveterately poor memory was added in those days an almost total unconscious amnesia..."

Another Cuban revolutionary who was reportedly tortured under the orders of Faget was Adamilda Verena Alfonso Batista.

=== Plot to kidnap or kill Faget's son ===
In 1957, Faget's son was targeted by the revolutionaries for kidnapping, and the Cuban intelligence uncovered a plot to kill or kidnap Mariano Faget Jr. at Colegio Cima, the private school that he attended. Faget Jr.'s physical education instructor was implicated in the plot.

Faget sent his wife and son back to Miami, and Walter E. Headley ordered protection on the family, but the Miami Police Department soon discovered another plot to kidnap Faget Jr. in Miami. Elena and Faget returned to Cuba, and Faget would not allow his son to leave the house.

In 1958, Faget Jr. was riding his bike when he was the target of an attempted drive-by shooting. Faget Jr. ducked out of the way as bullets hit the wall behind him.

== Exiled from Cuba ==
On the eve of December 31, 1958, and into the morning of January 1, 1959, with the success of the Cuban Revolution, Faget fled the Castro regime. That night, Faget took his family and joined Batista's government at the Camp Colombia airfield in Havana, and boarded a C-47 bound for New Orleans. Castro's soldiers fired their rifles up at the aircraft as it left Cuba.

After three days in New Orleans, Faget and his family were taken to a CIA safe house in Washington, D.C. for three weeks while Faget was debriefed, before becoming permanently exiled in Miami.

Faget's peer at BRAC, José de Jesús Castaño, was later captured and executed by Castro's forces.

=== Work at the Immigration and Naturalization Service ===
Faget was employed by the Immigration and Naturalization Service (INS) screening Cuban refugees for entry into the United States on behalf of the FBI and the CIA, against the wishes of many Cuban exiles who had been a part of the revolution to overthrow Batista.

The Department of Justice admitted that Faget was working for them “to keep Castro agents from coming into the United States.” An unnamed official at the DOJ said: “To get this job of screening done properly, we would deal with the devil himself.”

Historian Carl J. Bon Tempo writes:

"Cuban refugee groups in the United States complained that the colonel seemed more interested in investigating the role that refugees may have played in the downfall of the Batista regime than he did in eliciting intelligence on the Castro government or uncovering saboteurs and spies."

== Illness and death ==
In 1965, Faget became ill with a retinal detachment, and could no longer work full-time. In 1972, Faget died after a battle with cancer.
