= Enemy Activities Investigation Service =

Enemy Activities Investigation Service Servicio de Investigación de las Actividades Enemigas

Agency overview
- Formed: March 21, 1942
- Dissolved: End of World War II
- Superseding agency: Group for the Suppression of Subversive Activities

Jurisdictional structure
- Operations jurisdiction: Republic of Cuba

Operational structure
- Headquarters: Havana

The Enemy Activities Investigation Service (SIAE) (Spanish: Servicio de Investigación de las Actividades Enemigas) (Note: Also called the Officina, Buró or Sección de Investigación de Actividades Enemigas.) (Note: In English, these would be called the Office of the Investigation of Enemy Activities, Enemy Activities Investigation Section, or the Bureau for Counterintelligence against Enemy Activities) was a unit of the National Police of the Republic of Cuba during World War II dedicated to the investigation and hunting of Nazis, Abwehr agents, their allies in Spanish intelligence, and Imperial Japanese spies in the territory of Cuba.

From 1940 to 1944, the head of the SIAE was Mariano Faget Diaz.

SIAE became the Group for the Repression of Subversive Activities (GRAS), which was eventually merged into the Bureau for the Repression of Communist Activities (BRAC).

The Chief of the National Police of Cuba at this time was Manuel Benitez Valdés, who was sometimes confused to be the Director of the SIAE.

The Special Intelligence Service Liaison to SIAE at the beginning of the war was Ian Maxwell.

Heinz Lüning was an espionage agent who spied for the Abwehr in Cuba during World War II and was later executed by Cuba. Lüning was arrested by the SIAE and interred at the Princes Castle. He was the only German spy executed on espionage charges in all of Latin America during World War II.
