= Mariano Faget =

Mariano Faget may refer to:

- Mariano Faget Diaz, Republic of Cuba counterintelligence police officer and Nazi hunter, head of the anticommunist bureau
- Mariano Faget Jr., son of the above, first official of the United States Immigration and Naturalization Service (INS) to be convicted of violating the Espionage Act
