= Mariano Faget Jr. =

Cuban-American civil servant and spy

Mariano Faget
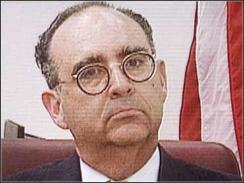
- Faget in 2000

Supervisory District Administration Officer at Immigration and Naturalization Service
- Termination: 2000

Personal details
- Born: July 2, 1945 (age 81) Havana, Cuba
- Died: Unknown
- Spouse: Maria Faget
- Parents: Elena Faget; Mariano Faget Diaz
- Education: Dade County Junior College

Military service
- Branch/service: United States Army Reserve

Mariano Faget is a naturalized American citizen and was an employee of the Immigration and Naturalization Service (INS) in Miami for over 35 years, notable for becoming at the time one of the highest-ranking Cuban-Americans at INS, and a District Supervisory Officer of the agency. Faget is the first INS official ever charged with espionage charges against the United States.

One month before his scheduled retirement from the INS in 2000, he was arrested by the Federal Bureau of Investigation on espionage charges, accused of selling information on the movements of Cuban exiles to the communist government of Cuba in exchange for business favors when the Cuba-America trade embargo would inevitably be lifted. Faget denied these charges but was found guilty on all four counts. It was revealed that he had been fed false information by the Federal Bureau of Investigation (FBI) in a complex sting operation that lasted over a year, called "Operation False Blue." He was sentenced by US District Judge Alan Stephen Gold to a 5-year prison term.

This was found ironic by the Cuban exile community in Little Havana because his father, Mariano Faget Diaz, had a reputation as one of the most brutal anti-Castro and anti-Communist police officers in the Batista regime, accused of torturing and murdering those he suspected of having communist affiliations.

Journalist Alfonso Chardy at The Miami Herald wrote: "Accused Cuban spy Mariano Faget Jr. has lived a life filled with ironies."

== Early life ==
In the summer of 1945, while his family was living in exile in Miami, Elena Faget - at nine months pregnant - flew to the family doctor's office in Havana to give birth. Faget was born in Cuba on July 25, 1945. However, Elena remained in Cuba for only one month before flying back to raise Faget in the family home in Florida.

In 1951, Faget was enrolled at the Auburndale Elementary School, which was across the street from his home.

In 1956, when Faget was in the fifth or sixth grade, the family returned to Cuba when his father was promoted to serve as the director of the Bureau for the Repression of Communist Activities (BRAC). Faget was enrolled at Colegio Cima, the private school in Havana where many children of Batista government military and police officers were enrolled.

Faget's father quickly gained a reputation for being brutal and ruthless in his persecution of suspected communists, and also tortured suspects in interrogations.

As a result of his father's position in the Batista government, Castro rebels targeted Faget in order to get to his father. In 1957, Cuban intelligence officers uncovered a plot to kill or kidnap Mariano Faget at Colegio Cima. Faget's physical education instructor was implicated in the plot.

Faget's father sent his wife and son back to Miami, and Walter E. Headley ordered protection on the family, but the Miami Police Department soon discovered another plot to kidnap Faget in Miami. Elena and Faget returned to Cuba, and his father would not allow Faget to leave the house.

In 1958, Faget was riding his bike when he was the target of an attempted drive-by shooting. Faget ducked out of the way as bullets hit the wall behind him.

== Permanent exile ==
On the eve of December 31, 1958 and into the morning of January 1, 1959, with the success of the Cuban Revolution, Faget fled the Castro regime. That night, Faget's father took his family and joined Batista's government at the Camp Columbia airfield in Havana, Cuba, and boarded a C-47 bound for New Orleans, full of Batista government officials and their families.

Faget told the Miami Herald: "My last view of Havana were the blue flashes of guns fired by Castro rebels shooting up at the planes." (disputed)

Castro's soldiers fired their rifles up at the aircraft as it left Cuba. (disputed)

After three days in New Orleans, Faget's family were taken to a CIA safe house in Washington, D.C. for three weeks while Faget's father was debriefed, before the family was permanently exiled in Miami.

In 1960, at age 14, Faget was enrolled at the Miami Senior High School. Faget joined the "Pan American Club," at Miami Senior. He graduated high school in the summer of 1963.

On November 22, 1963, the same day of the assassination of John F. Kennedy, Faget was sworn in as an American Citizen.

Faget was later educated and earned an Associate of Arts degree from Dade County Junior College. After earning his associate degree, Faget joined the United States Army Reserve.

== Career at the Immigration and Naturalization Service ==
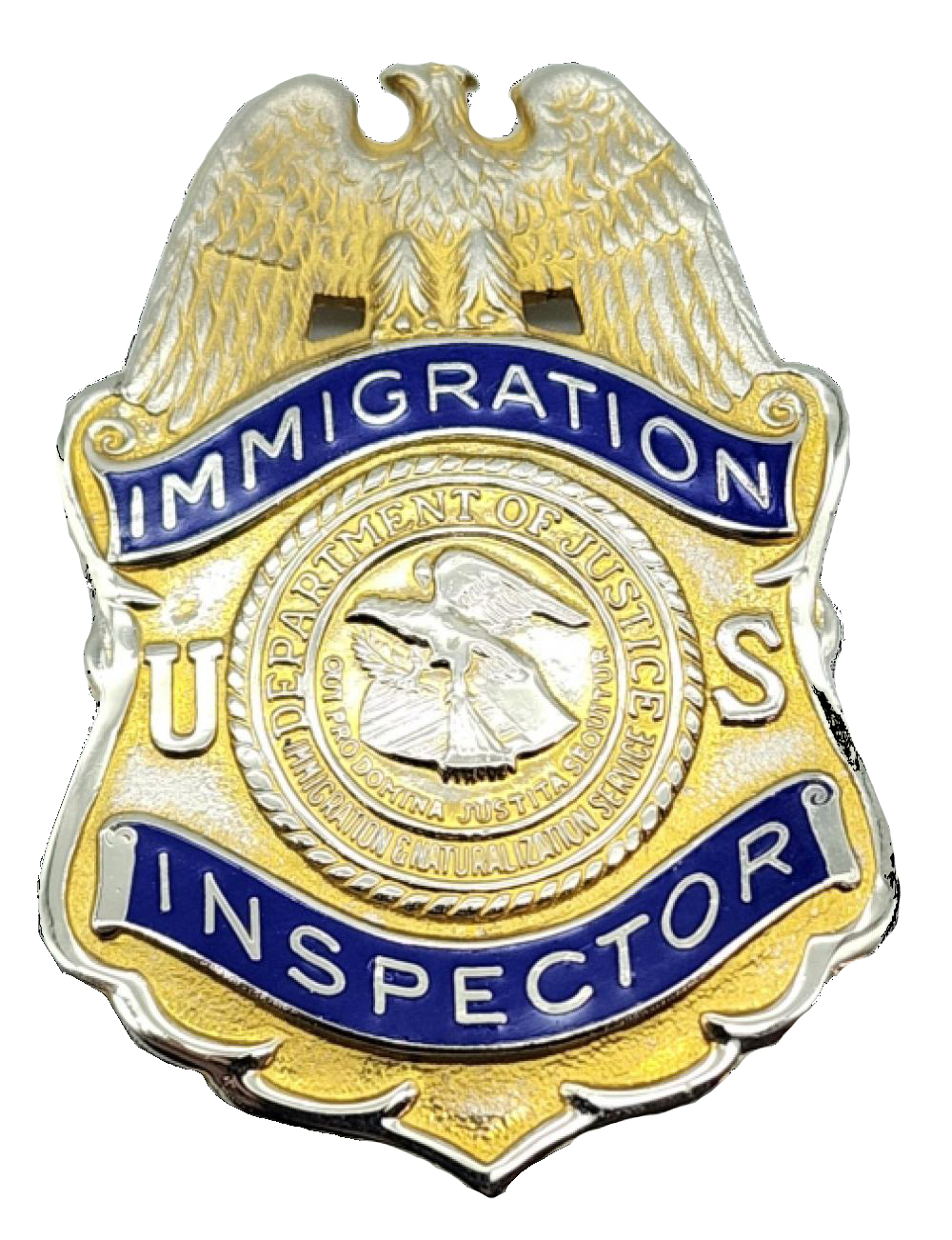
INS Immigration Inspector Badge

In 1965, Faget applied to be an interpreter at the Immigration and Naturalization Service (INS). His first assignment was to assist immigration inspectors interview Cuban refugees from Camarioca.

In 1970, Faget was promoted to INS clerk, a higher-level position.

On September 5, 1971, Faget was married to Maria Faget in Coral Gables.

Later that year, Faget moved to Southwest Dade City, Florida.

In 1971, Faget received a promotion to immigration Inspector and was posted to the Miami International Airport. Faget served as an immigration inspector for six years.

In 1977, Faget was promoted to Immigration Examiner at the INS District Headquarters.

Faget was later promoted to Supervisory District Administration Officer.

== Sting operation ==
The FBI first became suspicious of Faget in 1999 by complete accident, when they observed him meeting the target they were tracking in a bar at the Miami Airport. Their target was a member of the Cuban Interests Section at the Cuban Embassy in Washington, D.C. The FBI contacted INS, and the two agencies collaborated on an investigation that lasted months. They used surveillance methods to include technical and physical, videotaping, and wiretapping.

David A. Vise, a journalist for The Washington Post, wrote:

"The FBI said it had watched Faget, now in custody, making unauthorized contacts with Cuban intelligence officers in Miami, with an official in the Cuban diplomatic mission in Washington and with the New York businessman."

At the conclusion of the information gathering phase of the investigation, they jointly launched a sting operation they called "False Blue."

The first moment of the sting occurred when FBI Special Agent in Charge (SAC) Héctor Pesquera visited Faget at his office in the Miami INS building. He told Faget that he needed assistance preparing immigration documents in a "highly sensitive and top-secret Cuban defection."

Pesquera informed Faget that the defector was named Luis Molina. Faget informed Pesquera that he had had dinner with a group of friends and Molina happened to be there. When Pesquera asked if that had been Faget's only contact with Molina, Faget said it was.

Molina had in actuality been one of the men that the FBI had observed Faget meeting alone with in 1999 on two different occasions. The defection was also a lie - Molina was still in Cuba, and had absolutely no plans of defecting.

After this, INS agents requested assistance processing asylum papers for a defecting Cuban intelligence officer.

SAC Mallet said:

"Faget was told that the information he was being entrusted with was secret and very sensitive. The meeting was both videotaped and audiotaped. Approximately twelve minutes after that meeting, Faget placed a telephone call from his office to the offices of the New York businessman. Faget identified the full name of the individual for whom he had been asked to prepare the political asylum document."

By this, it is understood that the FBI had already gone through the process of obtaining a warrant and placing a tap on Faget's phone. The man that Faget called was Pedro Font, a business partner at America Cuba Incorporated, which was a business that Faget was involved with. The FBI believed that Faget had shared this information with Font for personal gain.

After this phone call, Font immediately met with a diplomat named Jose Imperatori, designated deputy consul in the Cuban Interests Section.

One week later, the FBI announced they had arrested Faget on espionage charges.

== Pedro Font ==
Mariano Faget and Pedro Font first met as schoolmates in Cuba at the Colegio Cima when they were both children during the Batista years in the mid 50's. Font was almost four years older than Faget and worked at that time as an investigator for BRAC (disputed), the Bureau ran by Faget's father.

In 1960, a year after the Faget family was exiled, Pedro Font joined the Cuban exodus and settled in Miami, where he would often visit the Faget family home on social occasions.

After several years, Font moved to South America to pursue "business opportunities."

Over the course of the next several decades, Faget and Font stayed in touch.

In 1993, Font was created the "America-Cuba Company." In 1996 or 1997, Faget became a partner in the company when one of the original partners left.

Faget told the Miami Herald:

"'It was Font who came up with the idea of America-Cuba with a view to getting ready for Castro's downfall, because at the time everybody believed that his days were numbered."

Faget also told the Herald reporters that he hadn't informed INS about his business because he hadn't made any money from it, and it "was just an idea."

== Jose Imperatori ==
As a result of this investigation, Jose Imperatori was given persona non grata (PNG) status and ordered to be expelled from the United States. On the morning of February 26, 2000, Imperatori resigned from his post voluntarily. However, Imperatori refused to leave the embassy in Bethesda, and went on a hunger strike in order to clear his and Faget's names.

Imperatori's efforts were unsuccessful. Imperatori eventually returned to Cuba, and became a hero of the Cuban state.

== Detainment and imprisonment ==
On February 18, 2000, a preliminary hearing was held at the U.S. District Court in Miami. Faget appeared before U.S. District Judge Stephen T. Brown and entered no plea. More than 40 people waited for him outside the building to post bond - but the judge ruled that Faget should be confined for another week pending a bond (bail) hearing.

On February 24, 2000, Miami Federal Magistrate Judge Barry Garber denied Faget bail, saying that Faget was a flight risk. Faget told the court that he had never been a communist, and had never been sympathetic to communism.

Faget spent several months in federal custody awaiting the start of his trial, and while his trial was ongoing.

On May 30, 2000, Faget was convicted on these four counts of violating the Espionage Act of 1917;

1. Disclosing classified information
2. Converting it for his own gain
3. Lying to the FBI
4. Failing to disclose foreign-business contacts on his security clearance application

Prosecuting attorneys Richard Gregorie and Curtis Miner requested a sentence of between 10 and 15 years.

Judge Alan Stephen Gold noted Faget's 35 years of "otherwise exemplary service," as well as the strange situation involving the case.

Gold said:

"What is unusual about this case is that it involved a sting operation where part of it was classified, and the other part was disinformation.''

Gold only sentenced Faget to five years in prison. He recommended to the Bureau of Prisons that Faget serve his sentence at the low-security complex at the United States Penitentiary in Coleman, Florida.

== Released from prison ==
According to the Bureau of Prisons, Mariano Faget was released from prison after serving less than two years, on September 5, 2003. This is the same day that the Senate appropriated over 28 million dollars to the Office of Cuba Broadcasting for further modernization of their Radio and TV Marti program.
