= Jose Imperatori =

Cuban diplomat

Jose Imperatori was a Cuban diplomat and ambassador expelled from the United States in connection to a joint Federal Bureau of Investigation and Immigration and Naturalization Service espionage investigation called "Operation False Blue." At the turn of the twentieth century, Jose Imperatori was given persona non grata (PNG) status and ordered to be expelled from the United States as a result of his connection to Mariano Faget Jr.

== Details ==
On the morning of February 26, 2000, Imperatori resigned from his post voluntarily. However, Imperatori refused to leave the embassy in Bethesda, and went on a hunger strike in order to clear his and Faget's names.

At a press conference announcing his intentions, Imperatori said:

"From this moment I declare myself on a hunger strike until I have been absolutely cleared of the accusations brought against me. I have become the victim of a major slander. I have been wrongly accused of doing intelligence work in the United States... The accusation brought against me is absolutely false. I feel it is my duty to state that the INS official is innocent of the accusation of espionage made against him, and I can help to prove it."

The official spokesperson for the Cuban Interests Section, Fernando Remírez, told reporters at the press conference:

“We want to be very clear that he is completely innocent, that he didn’t do anything wrong, that the Cuban Interests Section in Washington does not do any kind of intelligence or espionage activities.”

The Cuban Interests Section hired Kurt Schmoke to represent Imperatori.

Imperatori's efforts were unsuccessful. He was forcibly expelled to the Cuban embassy in Ottawa, Canada, where the Cuban government ordered him to stay for an additional 30 days. The Canadian government were furious at the Cuban government for dragging the neutral country into the situation, and also issued PNG status against Imperatori.

Imperatori eventually returned to Cuba, and became a hero of the state.
