= Percy E. Foxworth =

American FBI and counterintelligence executive (1906–1943)

Percy E. Foxworth (1906 – January 15, 1943) served as chief of the FBI's Special Intelligence Service (SIS) and as principal liaison with British Security Coordination (BSC). So beloved was he by the British that when he traveled through Latin America between September and December 1940, MI6 stations were ordered to fully cooperate with him along the way.

On January 15, 1943, Foxworth and Special Agent Harold Dennis Haberfeld were killed in a military airplane accident near Paramaribo, Surinam, en route to North Africa at the request of Gen. Dwight D. Eisenhower. The cause of the crash of the airplane was never ascertained. Although 35 people were on board the aircraft, search teams were only able to locate sufficient remains to be placed in a single casket, which was returned to the United States five years later and buried in a grave at Jefferson Barracks, Missouri. Following Assistant Director Foxworth's death, a Liberty ship named the S.S. P.E. Foxworth was launched in February 1943.

== Resources ==
- "FBI Agents Killed During the Performance of Law Enforcement Duty," FBI History: Hall of Honor. www.fbi.gov.
- Raymond J. Batvinis, The Origins of FBI Counterintelligence (Lawrence, KS: University of Kansas Press, 2007).
