= Manuel Benítez González =

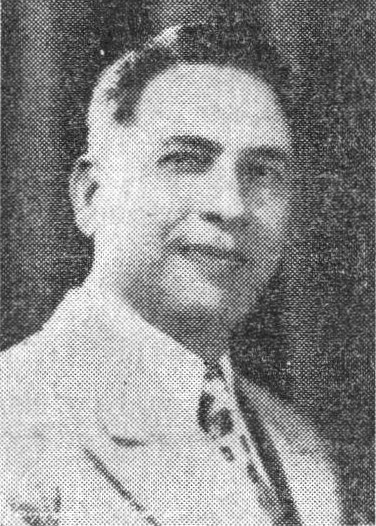

Director General Cuban Office of Immigration

Senator of the Congress of Cuba

Personal details
- Born: Regla
- Died: 1946
- Children: Manuel Benitez Valdés

Military service
- Branch/service: Cuban Liberation Army; Cuban National Army
- Rank: Colonel
- Battles/wars: Cuban War of Independence

Manuel Benítez y González was a Cuban Machadista (follower of Gerardo Machado) and soldier in the Cuban Liberation Army who helped purge the Spanish Empire from Cuba, and later a journalist for the Havana newspaper La Discusión.

== Biography ==
Benítez was 14 years old when he joined the Cuban Liberation Army.

After the Sergeant's Coup in 1933, and the overthrow of Gerardo Machado, Benítez - as commanding colonel of the 8th Regiment of the Rural Guard - was dismissed from his command and imprisoned at La Cabaña. When he was released from prison, he joined the Liberal Party of Cuba.

Under the presidency of Federico Laredo Brú, Benítez served as the director general of Immigration, and was a welcome recipient of Jewish refugees from Europe. In 1939, Benítez sold forged permits to German Jewish refugees for 150 dollars each, allowing them to enter the country for sanctuary and asylum.

However, certain people in the government did not appreciate this, and these forged permits were eventually denied entry into Cuba by the Cuban president. This scandal by the palace eventually forced the entire transatlantic ship MS St. Louis to return to Europe with over 900 Jews on board, after having been anchored in Havana for a full week. This is considered one of the darkest moments in Cuban-Jewish relations, and is known today as the "Voyage of the Damned."

Benítez was later elected to the Constituent Assembly, where he signed the Cuban Constitution of 1940. He later became a Cuban Senator, and head of the Senate Defense Committee.

Benítez died in 1946.
