= Heinz Lüning =

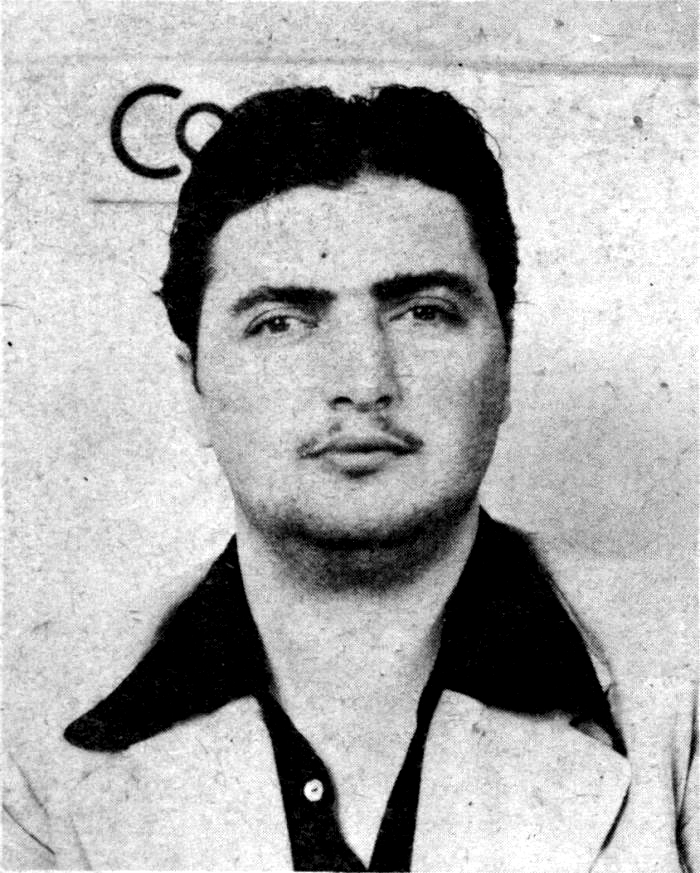
- Nicknames: Lumann; Enrique Augustino Lunin; Rafael Castillo
- Born: March 28, 1911; Bremen, German Empire
- Died: November 10, 1942 (aged 31) Havana, Cuba
- Cause of death: Execution by firing squad
- Branch: Abwehr
- Service number: A-3779
- Known for: The only German spy executed in Latin America during World War II
- Conflicts: World War II; Operation Bolívar; Cuba during World War II
- Spouse: Helga Lüning

Heinz August Adolf Sirich Lüning (March 28, 1911 - November 10, 1942) was an espionage agent who spied for the Abwehr in Cuba during World War II and was later executed by Cuba. It is unclear whether Lüning was incompetent or if he was on a personal mission to sabotage the Nazi war effort in the Caribbean and Latin America, but the result is that his work as an Abwehr intelligence officer was described by the British Secret Services (MI6) as mediocre and subpar. The Cuban government at the time maintained that his incompetence was a ruse, and that the Cuban intelligence apparatus had captured a genuine master spy.

After his discovery by the government of Fulgencio Batista, Lüning was publicly executed. His decision to join the Abwehr was motivated primarily by his desire to avoid dying on the frontline in Europe as a soldier, and the fact that he was an avowed anti-Nazi, and came from a family of anti-Nazis. Ultimately, this decision led to him becoming the only German spy executed on espionage charges in all of Latin America during World War II.

== Early life ==
Lüning was born on March 28, 1911, in Bremen, Germany, to a German father and an Italian mother. His father was a tobacco merchant and came from a family of tobacco merchants. He did not perform well in school. In 1924, when he was 13 years old, his mother died after a long battle with illness.

In 1929, during the Great Depression, his father committed suicide. Lüning was adopted by his uncle Gustav, who lived in Hamburg and was married to an American Chicagoan woman named Olga Bartholomae. Gustav owned the Dominican Tobacco Company in the Dominican Republic. His aunt and uncle raised him in Hamburg until he finished school and got a job with an American businessman named Albert Schilling at Classen Berger & Co.

In 1936, Lüning married his stepsister Helga - who he had gotten pregnant - and they moved to New York City. While in New York, they lived with Olga's brother, Philip Bartholomae, the famous American Broadway director and playwright. Briefly in 1936, Gustav sent Lüning to Santo Domingo to learn the business of the Dominican Tobacco Company, and to learn Spanish. When Helga was close to expecting the birth of her son, Lüning and Helga returned to Hamburg, where Adolf Bartholomae was born in November 1936. In 1937, he returned to Santo Domingo for a brief time.

Lüning did not enjoy the rise of Hitler, and applied for citizenship in the Dominican Republic in an attempt to escape. However, from 1937 to 1941, Lüning remained in Hamburg and worked for the B. Schoenfeld Company. His Spanish language lessons continued with a coworker at the company.

== World War II ==
=== Abwehr agent ===
In 1939, Lüning did not want to be drafted into the German army. He used his status as a Resident of the Dominican Republic to avoid conscription into the Wehrmacht in 1939, 1940, and 1941. He decided to join the Abwehr instead so that he could avoid fighting on the frontline. In June 1941, Lüning was recruited into the organization by Alfred Hartmann, who was connected to a friend of Lüning's uncle Gustav. As for language skills, with an Italian mother Lüning could already speak Italian. After having lived in New York, Lüning could speak English. After being tutored, Lüning could now speak Spanish, and was at that time learning some Portuguese. These languages were in addition to his native German.

Lüning's cover name became "Lumann." Lüning was then sent for training at the Abwehr training school (AST) at Klopstockstrasse 2-8 in Hamburg. His training lasted for six weeks, and he was given special training assignment under the direction of Hartmann. He learned how to communicate using Morse code, Invisible ink, Wireless telegraphy and Radio. He also learned basic Tradecraft. Lüning was a mediocre student at this school and his ability with a radio was not optimal for an intelligence officer.

=== Stationed in Cuba ===
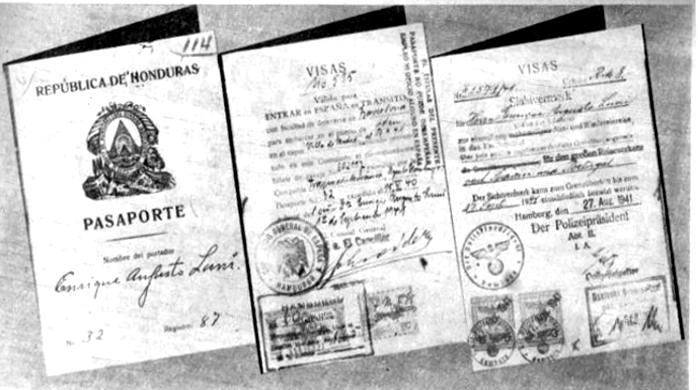
Fake Honduran passport issued in the name of Lüning's alias "Enrique Augustino Luni."

On September 10, 1941, Lüning boarded the ship Villa de Madrid in Barcelona, and arrived in Havana on September 29, 1941. One of the other men on this ship was an Abwehr agent named Ricardo Dotres, but the two men would not maintain contact. His first residence in Havana was the Siboney Hotel, down the street from the Wonder Bar, where he would attempt to gain information from locals and pick up women. By all accounts, he was a prolific womanizer throughout most of his life.

Later, he went into partnership with a Cuban in the management of La Estampa, a women's fashion store in Old Havana at 314 Industria Street.

At the Wonder Bar and other bars and taverns around the city, he also plied information from off-duty drunken sailors while their ships were docked in the port of Havana.

His alias in Havana was "Enrique Augusto Luni," a Jewish refugee who had fled the Nazis. In his letters back to headquarters, his alias was sometimes "Rafael Castillo," but he also used many other names.

Rolando Ancieto at Habana Radio writes that while he was living in Old Havana, those who knew him described him as "...a man of fine manners, well dressed and kind... a perfect gentleman, of few words and a hurried walk."

The British station in Bermuda intercepted 44 of Lüning's letters addressed to his handler in Lisbon, Portugal, who went by the name of "Mr. Mutz." His letters were sent with innocuous text, and additional text in invisible ink which the British had chemical methods to expose. MI6 and the FBI noted that most of the information Lüning sent in these secret letters was from the local newspaper, and could have been obtained by anyone. None of this information was timely or relevant to the Abwehr, they noted, because most of the events he mentioned in his letters had already happened.

Due to the dangers posed to the allied supply line to Europe from the Americas by Abwehr activity in Latin America, the Allied intelligence agencies were extremely concerned with Lüning's presence in Cuba. Their suspicion was that he might be involved in feeding shipping information to German U-Boats.

However, Thomas D. Schoonover writes that Lüning could not figure out how to use his radio, so he never communicated with any German naval forces while in Cuba. He states that Lüning was also given specific directions not to initiate any contact with Abwehr agents located in the Caribbean, and was not given access to the standard radio code book.

Modern Cuban sources question Schoonover on this: they point to a telegram that was sent to Lüning from Argentina instructing him to change frequencies on his radio "in which he transmitted and received messages." These Cuban sources note that Schoonover did not perform any of his research inside of Cuba, due to Cuban travel restrictions on American citizens.

One letter was of particular interest to the Bermuda station. The letter was from the Falangist businessman Bienvenido Alegría in Gijón, in which Bienvenido used Lüning's real name and address in Havana.

After reading this letter, MI6 officers and FBI agents flew to Havana and began coordinating with the Cuban authorities, and especially with General Manuel Benitez.

== Arrest and execution ==
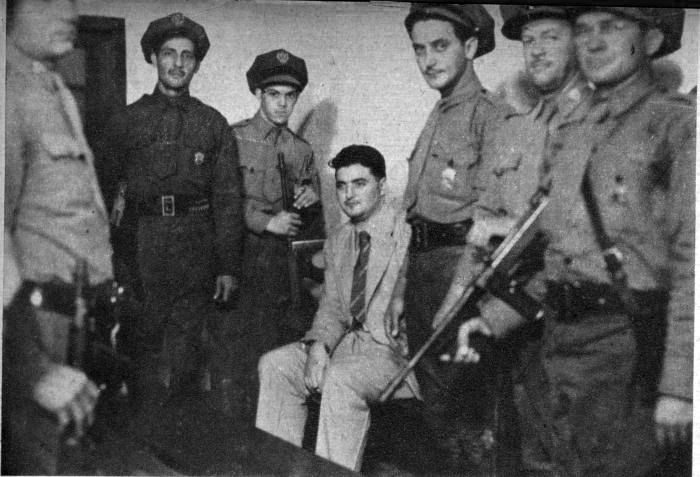
Cuban investigators, court bailiffs, and members of the Havana police pose with Lüning while he is awaiting trial in the Fifth court of Havana.

On 5 September, 1942, Lüning was arrested by Captain Mariano Faget at a guest house by where he was staying in Old Havana, on Teniente Rey Street. The police seized two inoperable shortwave radio transmitters, radio tubes, invisible ink, a false passport, letters, maps, documents, and a specially designed pistol.

That special pistol - a pistol in the shape of an ink pen that fired a single 12 mm caliber shot - is currently in the Museo Oscar María de Rojas in Cárdenas, Cuba. It was featured on display in 2018.

Lüning was taken to the Castillo del Príncipe, where he remained as an inmate until his death.

For J. Edgar Hoover, Fulgencio Batista, and General Manuel Benitez, the capture of Lüning proved to be a press field day, and they used this event each to provide legitimacy for their organizations in the media. However, most of the officials in these organizations might have known that Lüning had no value as an intelligence asset to the Germans.

After his capture, Lüning was subjected to interrogation by the Batista regime on over 30 separate occasions. Most of his information was reliable, because he did not like the Nazis, so he gave the Cubans everything that he could think of to provide.

The CIA officer assigned to serve with General Benitez wrote of Lüning:

"I was assigned to act as the cryptographer for a notorious spy, Heinz August Luning, who had a radio set he had built from parts purchased in Habana and who operated by 1#01 to Hamburg. He was caught, through his own ineptness; and the FBI Wished to run him as a double agent, and they had hopes of getting data on assignments given him by Abwehrste lIV Hamburg; and they hoped to feed a few items of deception through him to the Nazis. This did not last very long, however, for the Cubans decided that they would shoot this known spy. They had little patience and could not be convinced that a double agent could be run to advantage so, with the approval of President Fulgencio Batista, Agusto Luni, who was in reality Heinz August Luning, was put against the wall and shot. This ended my second job in Habana."

=== Wrapping up the PYL ===
The greatest impact that his interrogations had on the war is the fact that he had knowledge of German spies operating in Chile, and confessed to receiving a wire transfer for $1,500 that originated there. The Chilean Minister of Foreign Affairs at the time, Ernesto Barros Jarpa, was reluctant to move on this information because he had consistently denied the existence of German agents in Chile, and had actually arrested the journalist Benjamín Subercaseaux only the month prior for printing a story that stated such.

Chilean Interior Minister Raúl Morales Beltramí moved on Lüning's information, arresting a large number of members of what had previously been known only as PYLREW or the PyL Network, which is what the network would sign their communiques with. Prior to Lüning's arrest, American intelligence officials were aware of the PyL, but could not locate them in Chile. They were known only to operate somewhere to the east of Valparaiso. "PyL," in Spanish is an abbreviation for "Patria y Libertad," or in English "Fatherland and Liberty."

Foreign Minister Jarpa resigned as a result of the backlash and scandal surrounding the arrest of the PYL.

=== Trial and execution ===
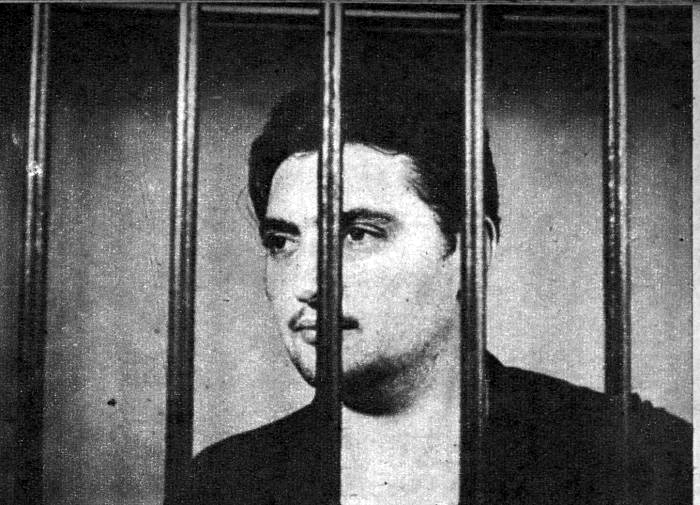
Last photograph ever taken of Heinz Lüning, only hours before he was executed.

In a closed-door trial, five judges unanimously sentenced Lüning to death.

On November 10, 1942, Lüning was executed by firing squad, only hours after he discovered that his request for pardon had been rejected.

The journalists present at his execution noted that he remained calm, did not say a word, and did not even flinch as the soldiers took aim and fired.

== See also ==
- Operation Bolívar#Cuba
- Cuba during World War II

== In popular culture ==
- Our Man in Havana, 1958 novel by Graham Greene
- Our Man in Havana (film), 1959 film adaptation of the novel
