= Battle of the Hotel Nacional of Cuba =

1933 military engagement in Havana, Cuba

Coordinates: 23°8′35″N 82°22′50″W

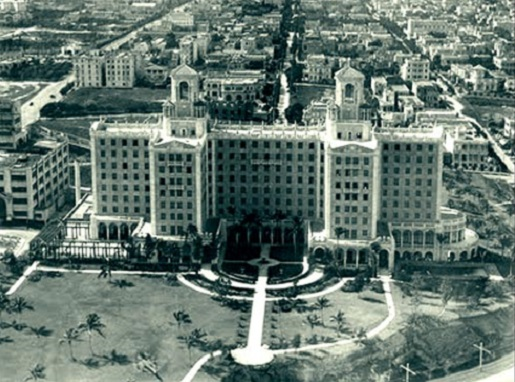
Hotel Nacional de Cuba

The Battle of the Hotel Nacional de Cuba took place on October 2, 1933 (11 hours). After the Sergeants' Revolt on September 4, 1933 and the proclamation of sergeant Fulgencio Batista as the new Army Chief of Staff, replacing Julio Sanguily Echarte, the higher ranking army officials (such as captains, colonels, and generals) refused to recognize this proclamation. Suffering from a hemorrhaging ulcer in his stomach at the time, Sanguily would rest at the Hotel Nacional de Cuba. In addition to Sanguily, the United States ambassador, Sumner Welles was also staying at the Hotel Nacional de Cuba. Given the importance of Sanguily, who in the eyes of the higher ranking army officials, was the legitimate Army Chief of Staff and on the other hand the fact that the U.S. ambassador himself was staying at Hotel Nacional, it followed that the Hotel Nacional was the perfect place for the army officials to regroup and put Ramon Grau's government in a deadlock.

On September 8, 1933, United States Ambassador to Cuba at the time, Sumner Welles telegraphed the following to the United States Secretary of State,

The Hotel Nacional in Habana, where many of the American colony are living at the present moment and to which I myself have moved since the lease on my house expired, has been decided upon today by the Cuban Army officers as headquarters. Approximately 500 officers fully armed are in the hotel. Some of them have received information that their houses have been sacked by the soldiers this morning and many of them are in fear of their lives. They refuse to leave the hotels since they state that it is the only place open to them in Habana, which can be readily defended.

The battle of the Hotel Nacional de Cuba finally began on October 2, 1933. It is said by most scholars that the fighting began on the side of the soldiers surrounding the Hotel Nacional. The army officials had approximately 400 men, whereas the soldiers were 3,000 strong. Despite these differences in number, the officials had some key advantages, namely the positioning of the Hotel Nacional relative to the soldiers surrounding the Hotel. It was quite clear that the numerous windows of the Hotel provided the army officials better positioning than the soldiers who would be clearly visible from any of the Hotel's windows. Secondly, many among the officials were expert shooters; many had fought during the Cuban War of Independence of the late 19th century. These advantages were reflected in the battle, that after 11 hours of fighting casualties place the number of soldiers dead at 80, whereas only 14 army officials were killed in the brawl. That day one unit (Patria ship) of the Navy bombarded the Hotel Nacional de Cuba. With low munitions and the impossibility of resistance, the army officials capitulated. After the surrender, probably due to high casualties suffered by the soldiers, some officials were murdered in cold-blood by the soldiers.
