= Cuba during World War II =

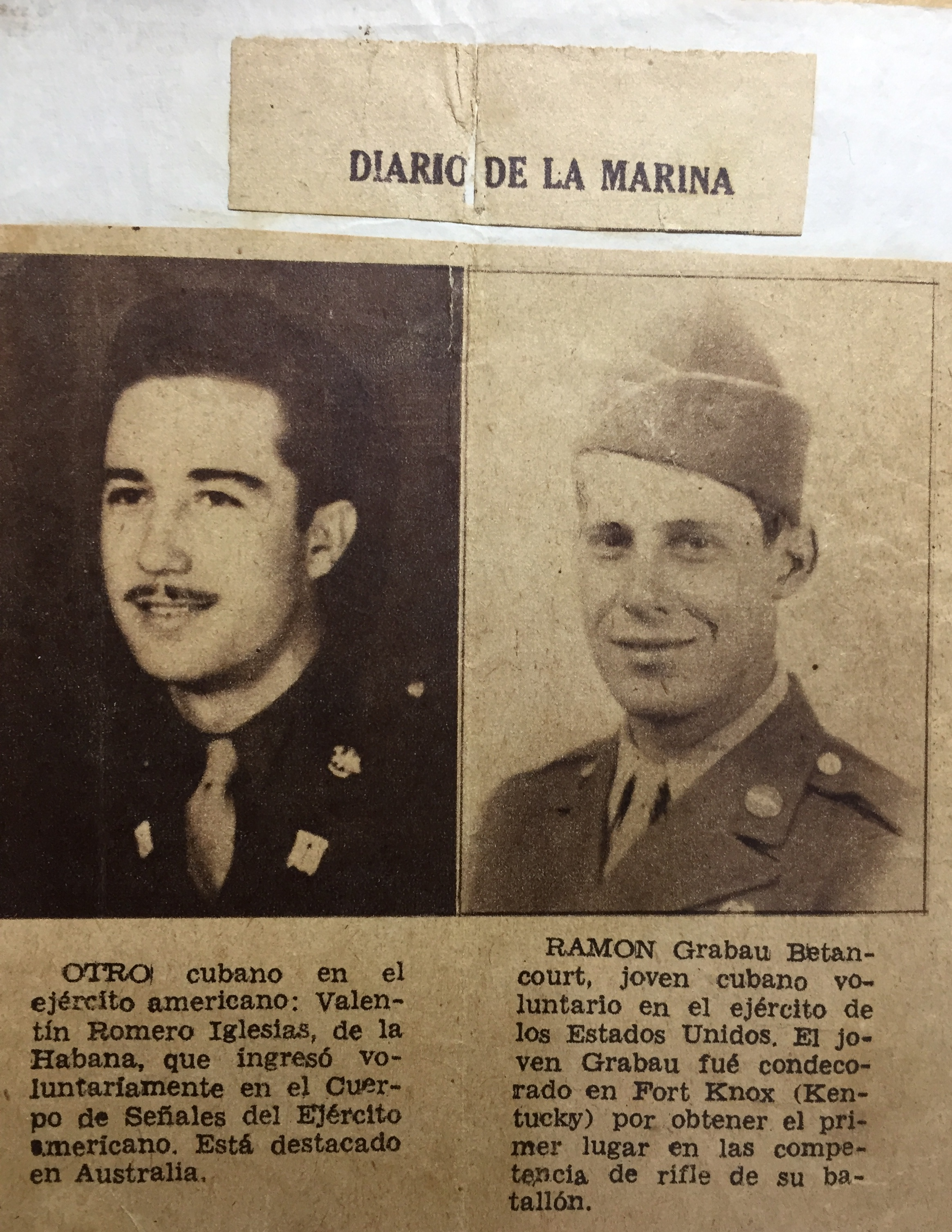
Cuban-American soldiers

The history of Cuba during World War II begins in 1939. Because of Cuba's geographical position at the entrance of the Gulf of Mexico, Havana's role as the principal trading port in the West Indies, and the country's natural resources, Cuba was an important participant in the American Theater of World War II, and it was one of the greatest beneficiaries of the United States' Lend-Lease program. Cuba declared war on the Axis powers in December 1941, making it one of the first Latin American countries to enter the conflict. When the war ended in 1945, the Cuban military had developed a reputation of being the most efficient and co-operative Caribbean nation.

== Brú and Batista ==
Federico Laredo Brú was the Cuban president when the war began. His only significant crisis related to the war before he left office in 1940 was the MS St. Louis affair. The MS St. Louis was a German ocean liner that was carrying over 900 Jewish refugees from Germany to Cuba. Upon her arrival in Havana, the Cuban government refused to allow the refugees to land because they did not have proper permits and visas. After ocean liner sailed north, the governments of both the United States and Canada also refused to accept the refugees and so the St. Louis sailed back across the Atlantic and dropped the passengers off in Europe. Some went to Britain, but most went to Belgium and France, which were soon overrun by German forces. Ultimately, because of the repeated refusal to take in the refugees, many of them were taken prisoner by the Germans and killed in concentration camps.

After the 1940 Cuban elections, Brú was succeeded by the "strongman and chief" of the Cuban Army, Fulgencio Batista. At first, the United States was concerned about Batista's intentions on whether he would align his country with the Axis or the Allies. Batista, shortly after becoming president, legalized a pro-fascist organization linked to Francisco Franco and his regime in Spain, but fear of any Nazi sympathies of Batista was dispelled when he sent the British a large quantity of sugar as a gift. Later, fear of any possible sympathy for Franco was also dispelled when he suggested to the United States that it launch a joint US-Latin American invasion of Spain to overthrow Franco and his regime, but the plan did not materialize.

Batista's support for the Allied cause was confirmed in February 1941, when he ordered all German and Italian consular officials to leave his country. Cuba entered the war on December 9, 1941, by declaring war on Japan, which had launched a devastating attack on the United States Navy base at Pearl Harbor, Hawaii, two days earlier. Cuba declared war on Germany and Italy on December 11, 1941 and, following the Americans, broke relations with Vichy France on November 10, 1942.

== Contribution to Battle of the Caribbean ==
According to Rear Admiral Samuel Eliot Morison, Cuba's military was the "most cooperative and helpful of all the Caribbean states" during the war and its navy was "small but efficient" in its fight against German U-boats. Upon Cuba's declaration of war on the Axis powers, Batista signed an agreement with the United States that gave permission for the US to build airfields in Cuba for the protection of the Caribbean sealanes, and he also signed a mutual defense pact with Mexico to defend against enemy submarines in the Gulf of Mexico. Among the new American bases was the San Antonio Air Base near San Antonio de los Baños, and the San Julián Air Base, in Pinar del Rio, both of which were built in 1942 and turned over to the Cuban military after the end of the war. The United States also supplied Cuba with modern military aircraft, which were vital for coastal defense and anti-submarine operations, and refitted the Cuban Navy with modern weapons and other equipment.

During World War II, the Cuban Navy escorted hundreds of Allied ships through hostile waters, sailed nearly 400,000 miles on convoy and patrol duty, flew over 83,000 hours on convoy and patrol duty, and rescued over 200 U-boat victims from the sea, all without losing a single warship or aircraft to enemy action. However, even though the Cuban military was praised for its conduct, rumors persisted throughout the war that the Germans were operating small bases hidden in coves along Cuba's coast, which were used to resupply the U-boats. Nevertheless, the rumors were unjustified, and the lack of such bases in the Caribbean forced the Germans to develop supply submarines, the German Type XIV submarine, which was nicknamed "milk cows," for logistics.

=== Attacks on Cuban ships ===
Cuba lost six merchant ships during the war, and the Cuban Navy was credited with sinking one German submarine. The first four sunken merchant ships were the Manzanillo, a steamer of 1,025 tons, the 1,685-ton Santiago de Cuba, the 1,983-ton Mambi, and the 5,441-ton Libertad. Manzanillo was sunk with the Santiago de Cuba on August 12, 1942, by U-508. The two ships were sailing in Special Convoy 12 when they were attacked off the Florida Keys. Altogether, 33 sailors were killed in what became the deadliest attack on the Cuban merchant marine during the war, and 30 others survived.

The next engagement occurred on May 13, 1943, when U-176 sank Mambi. Mambi was with Convoy NC-18, sailing six miles off Manati, when she was hit by a single torpedo, sinking her quickly, killing 23 men, including five American United States Navy Armed Guards, who manned the ship's weapons; 11 others survived, including the ship's master and one of the armed guards. The 2,249-ton American ship SS Nickeliner was also sunk during the same attack after it had been struck by two torpedoes. The first torpedo explosion lifted the ship's bow out of the water and threw up a column of water and flames about 100 ft into the air. The second damaged the tanks of ammonia water that the ship was carrying. Miraculously, the crew, which included seven armed guards, escaped into lifeboats without a single loss of life. They were rescued by a Cuban submarine chaser as Nickeliner sank and landed at Nuevitas.

Libertad was the largest Cuban merchant ship sunk in the war. On the morning of December 4, 1943, the 5,441-ton Libertad was sailing about 75 miles southwest of North Carolina's Cape Hatteras, with Convoy KN-280 (sailing Key West to New York), when the U-129 attacked her. Launching four torpedoes, U-129 struck Libertad twice on the port side, causing the ship to first list severely and then sink rapidly. The crew had no time to send out distress signals and was still lowering life rafts when the sea water reached the deck of the ship: 25 men were killed, and 11 others were rescued by the United States Navy after they had been several hours adrift at sea.

The last two Cuban merchant ships were sunk in February 1944, apparently without the loss of life. Altogether, Cuba lost 10,296 tons of shipping during the war, as well as about 80 lives, including those of the American armed guards. Today, there is a monument in Havana's Avenida del Puerto for the people who died in the attacks.

==== Explosion in Havana determined accidental ====
On February 6, 1943, an American barge loaded with gasoline exploded in the port of Havana, killing four people. However, General Manuel Benitez Valdés, the Cuban national chief of police, said that the cause of the explosion was "an accumulation of gasoline," indicating that this was an accident, but investigations were carried out.

=== The sinking of U-176 ===
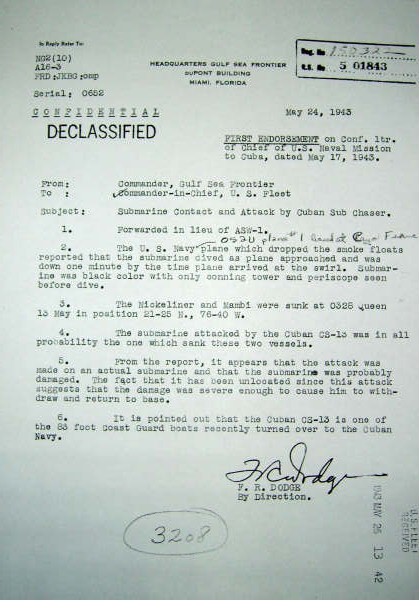
A declassified United States Navy report on the sinking of U-176.

The only U-boat sunk by the Cuban Navy was U-176, the submarine that had sunk Mambi and Nickeliner. On May 15, 1943, a squadron of Cuban submarine chasers, formed by the CS-11, CS-12 and CS-13, sailed from Isabela de Sagua toward Havana escorting the Honduran ship Wanks, and the Cuban ship Camagüey, both of which were loaded with sugar. The crews of the merchant ships, as well as those of the warships were on full alert. Just before their departure, a warning had been received that a surfacing submarine had been detected off the northern coast of Matanzas.

The ships sailed in forward lines 500 yd (460 m) apart. Camagüey was on the flank nearest to the coast. The escort navigated at a distance of 750–1,000 yd (690–910 m). The CS-12 was in front, followed by the CS-11 with the squadron chief on board and, finally, the CS-13 was at the rear. At 17:15, when the convoy was off of Cayo Megano, an American Kingfisher floatplane appeared in the sky coming from the northeast. The plane went into a nosedive and, flying at low altitude, circled twice, swaying and turning on and off its engine. According to an established code, those maneuvers were used to announce the presence of a German U-boat on and to mark its exact position. The Kingfisher then dropped a smoke float.

After dropping the float, the Cuban squadron chief ordered the commander of CS-13, Ensign Mario Ramirez Delgado, to explore the area pointed out by the plane. Once the order had been received, the CS-13 sailed speedily toward the area, where the patrol boat's sonar received a clear and precise contact at 900 yards. The seaman operating the sonar, Norberto Collado Abreu, was glued to the equipment, without missing a sound. The attack then started: three depth charges, set to explode at 100, 150, and 250 feet, were dropped from the stern, in accordance with the calculated speed of the submarine.

Four explosions were clearly detected. The fourth explosion was so strong that the stern of the Cuban ship was submerged, and water came in through the hatchway of the engine room. At the time, the hydrophones reported a sound that was similar to a liquid bubbling when it comes from a submerged container that is suddenly opened and so indicated that the U-boat had been hit. To finish the U-boat off, the patrol boat launched two more depth charges, which were set to explode at 250 feet. A few minutes later, a dark stain was observed on the surface of the water. A spurt of a black and viscous substance, smelling like gasoline came, up from the deep. Although there was little doubt that the U-boat had been sunk, Delgado was ordered to take a sample of the contaminated seawater to confirm the victory. Even then, it was not until after the war, when the Allies seized Germany's naval records, that proof of U-176's sinking was found. According to the seized documents, U-176 was under the command of Captain Lieutenant Reiner Dierksen, had sunk eleven enemy ships in her career, and was herself sunk with all hands lost.

The exploration of the battle area with the hydro-acoustic equipment continued for a short time after the engagement, but no sound was detected. The CS-13 then joined the convoy again and continued its crossing. Upon arriving in Havana and after he had personally informed the Head of the Navy, Delgado spoke on the phone with President Batista, who ordered him to keep absolute silence about what had happened. For some unknown reason, according to Delgado, the sinking of U-176 remained a secret to the Cuban public for the rest of the war. In 1946, Delgado was finally awarded the Meritorious Naval Service Order with Red Badge. Furthermore, Rear Admiral Samuel E. Morison, official historian of the US Navy, recognized his success in his work History of United States Naval Operations in World War II, in which he also praised the ability and efficiency of the Cuban Navy.

Samuel E. Morison wrote the following about the engagement:

...The CS-13 patrol boat, commanded by ... Mario Ramirez Delgado, turned toward the gas, made good contact through the sonar and launched two perfect attacks with deep charges which annihilated U-176. This was the only successful attack against a submarine done by a surface unit smaller than a PCE of 180 feet, thus, the sinking is properly considered with great pride by the small but efficient Cuban Navy.

== Lüning Affair ==
German espionage activity in Cuba was minor, despite the country's importance to the Allied war effort, and was eliminated by Allied counterintelligence before it could really begin. Shortly after the war started, the Germans began operating a clandestine communications network in South America to collect secret information and to smuggle it safely out of the region to German-occupied Europe. For Cuba, the Abwehr sent a man, Heinz Lüning, to Havana with orders to establish a secret radio station and then to transmit the information collected to agents in South America, from where it would then be sent directly to Germany.

According to author Thomas Schoonover, the plan could have worked, but Lüning was an incompetent spy who failed to master the very basics of espionage. For example, he was never able to get his radio working correctly, he did not understand how to use the secret ink that he was supplied with, and he missed drop boxes. However, after his premature arrest in August 1942, Allied officials, including President Batista, General Manuel Benítez, J. Edgar Hoover, and Nelson Rockefeller, attempted to fabricate a link between Lüning and the German submarines operating in the Caribbean by claiming that he was in contact with them via radio, to provide the public with an explanation for their failures in the early U-boat campaign. Allied officials elevated Lüning's importance to that of a "master spy," but there is no evidence that he ever came across even a single piece of important intelligence during his time in Cuba. Lüning was found guilty of espionage and executed in Cuba in November 1942, the only German spy put to death in Latin America during the war.

== Hemingway's patrols ==
Ernest Hemingway was living at his home, Finca Vigía, in Cuba when the war began. His first contribution to the Allied war effort without leaving the island was to organize his own counter intelligence force to root out any Axis spies operating in Havana. Calling it his "Crook Factory," Hemingway's unit consisted of 18 men, many of whom he had worked with five years before during the Spanish Civil War. The effort was unsuccessful, however, and Hemingway soon turned his attention to fighting the German U-boats operating in the Caribbean Sea.

Just three weeks after receiving permission from Ambassador Spruille Braden to form the "Crook Factory," Hemingway asked Braden for permission to arm his fishing boat, the Pilar, for patrols against U-boats off of the Cuban coast. Surprisingly, Braden gave permission to Hemingway, who proceeded to arm the Pilar and its crew with machine guns, bazookas, and hand grenades. Hemingway's plan was similar to that of the Q-ship idea: he would sail around in what appeared to be a harmless pleasure craft, inviting the Germans to surface and board, and when they did so, the boarding party would be disposed of with the machine guns, and the U-boat would then be engaged with the bazookas and grenades.

Hemingway's patrols against German U-boats turned out to be just as unsuccessful as the counterintelligence operation had been. As the months passed, and as no U-boat appeared, the patrols of the Pilar turned into fishing trips, and the grenades were thrown into the sea as "drunken sport." After adding his sons Patrick and Gregory to the crew, Hemingway acknowledged that his U-boat hunting venture had "turned into a charade," but he never admitted it straightforwardly. Years later, the Cuban naval officer Mario Ramirez Delgado, who sank U-176, said that Hemingway was "a playboy that hunted submarines off the Cuban coast as a whim."

== See also ==
- Battle of the Caribbean
- Cuba during World War I
- Operation Bolivar
- Guantanamo Bay Naval Base
- Granma (yacht)
