= Camp Columbia (Havana) =

Cuban military base (1898-1961)

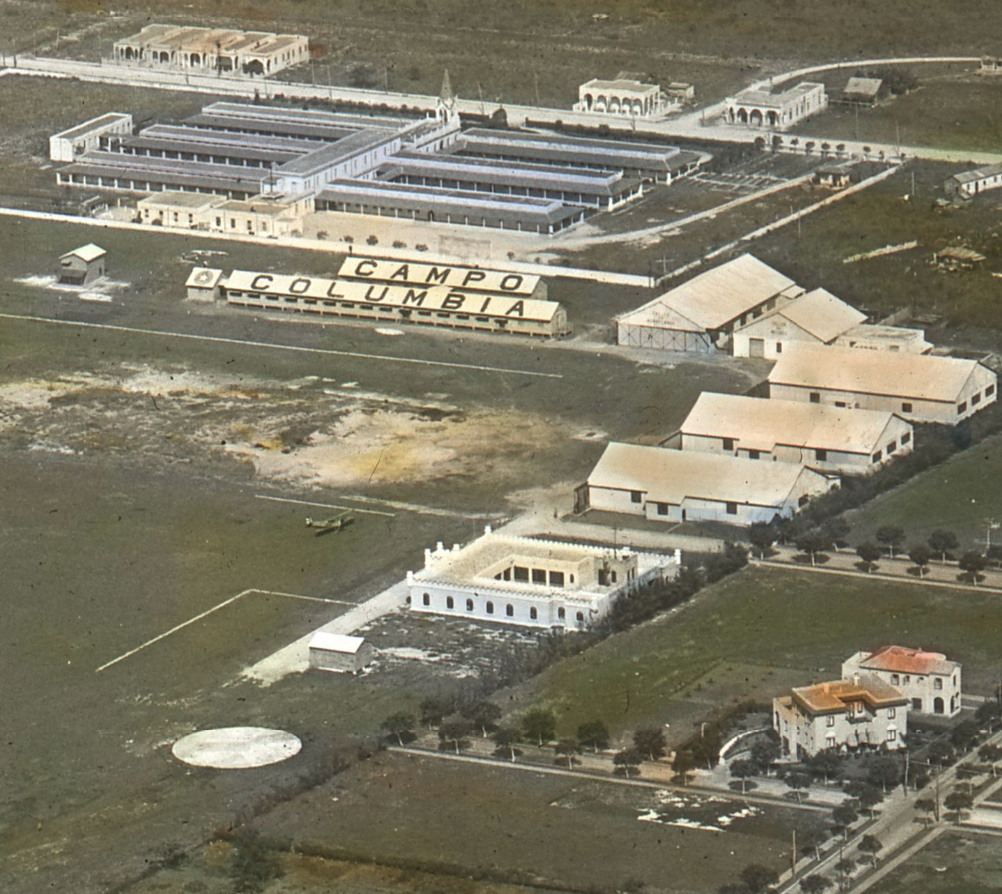

Site information
- Type: Military base
- Controlled by: Military Government of Cuba (United States; 1898-1902); Republic of Cuba (1902–1959); Cuba (1959-1961)
- Condition: Redesignated as Camp Freedom (Ciudad Libertad); airfield briefly integrated into Ciudad Libertad Airport

Location
- Location within Cuba
- Coordinates: 23°05′31″N 82°26′18″W

Site history
- Built: 1898
- Demolished: 1961

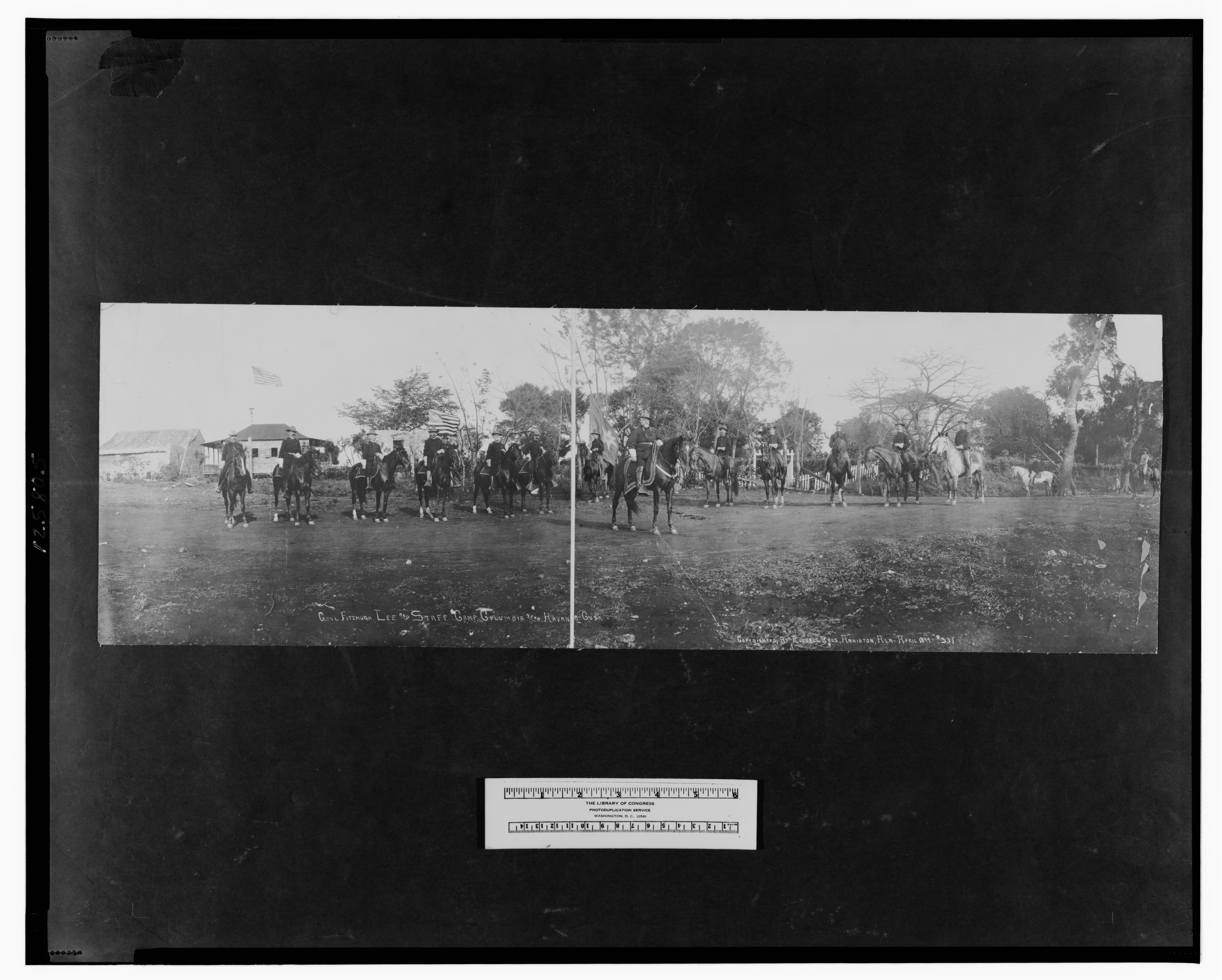
General Fitzhugh Lee and staff at Camp Columbia

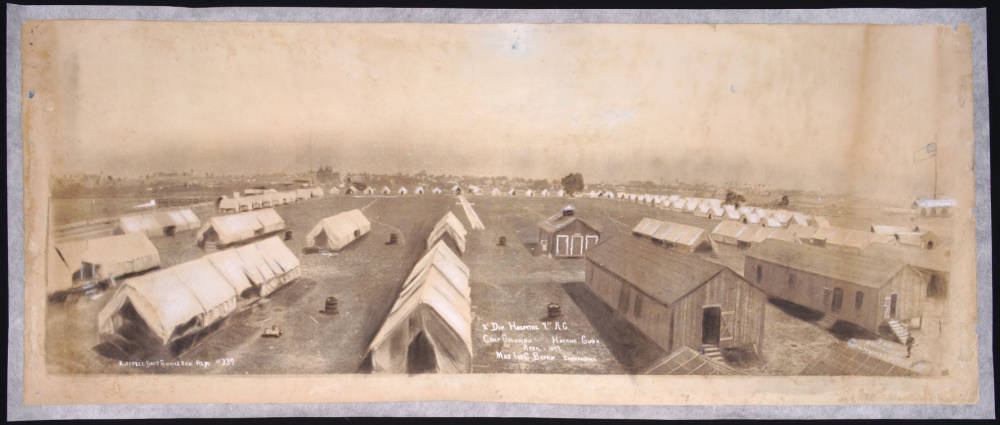
A hand colored panoramic photograph of the 2nd Division Hospital, 7th Army Corps at Camp Columbia in Havana, Cuba during April 1899.

Camp Columbia (Spanish: Campo Columbia), later known as Camp Freedom (Spanish: Ciudad Liberdad) was a military post in Havana constructed by the United States Army during the Spanish–American War and the Cuban War of Independence.

== History ==
Army troops of the VII Corps 3rd Infantry were stationed here immediately following the war until April 1899.

Columbia later became a training camp for the Republic of Cuba (1902–1959).

This camp would later be the military headquarters for the Cuban military, and the site of several revolutionary events in the early half of the twentieth century. Fulgencio Batista and Manuel Benitez Valdés were both stationed here, and this was the location of the first events of the Cuban Revolution of 1933.

Around midnight on January 1, 1959, during the Triumph of the Revolution, the highest-ranking officials in the Batista government arranged to exfiltrate the country from the Camp Columbia airfield. Three hours after midnight, three large aircraft lifted off from this airfield, marking the official end of the Cuban Revolution and the transition of the country to communism under the Castro regime.

On January 8, 1959, Fidel Castro held a rally at Camp Columbia Airfield.

The Camp was redesignated as "Camp Freedom" (Ciudad Libertad) by the communist government, until its closure in 1961. The Camp Columbia Airfield briefly became a part of Ciudad Libertad Airport.
