= Bureau for the Repression of Communist Activities =

Secret police force in 1950s Cuba under Fulgencio Batista

- Buró para Represión de las Actividades Comunistas
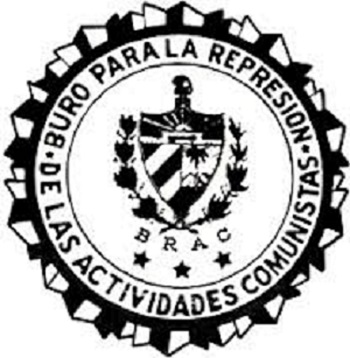
- Logo of the BRAC featuring the Cuban coat of arms

Agency overview
- Formed: May 1955
- Dissolved: c. 1958
- Type: Secret police

The Bureau for the Repression of Communist Activities (Spanish: Buró para Represión de las Actividades Comunistas, BRAC) was a secret police agency maintained by Cuban President Fulgencio Batista in the 1950s, which gained a reputation for brutality in its fight against the 26th of July Movement.

The bureau was headed by former Nazi hunter Mariano Faget, who previously served as director of the counter-espionage unit Enemy Activities Investigation Service (Servicio de Investigación de las Actividades Enemigas) (Note: Also called the Officina, Buró or Sección de Investigación de Actividades Enemigas.) from 1940 to 1944.

On Dec. 7, 1955, BRAC agents fired upon an anti-Batista demonstration held by the Federation of University of Students in Havana. Several demonstrators, including Camilo Cienfuegos, were wounded when the police opened fire on the crowd.

The development of BRAC was aided and encouraged by the CIA starting in 1956.
