= Special Intelligence Service =

US counterintelligence branch in South America (1940–46)

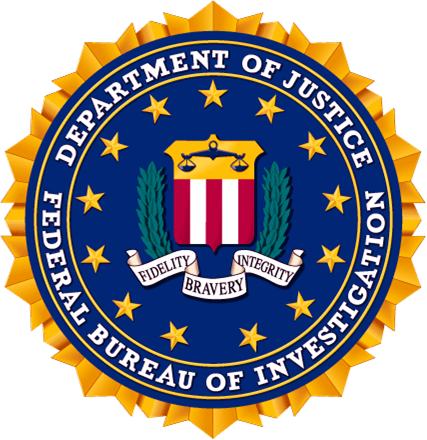

Agency overview
- Formed: June 24, 1940
- Dissolved: 1946
- Headquarters: Room 4332, 45 Rockefeller Plaza, New York City, New York
- Agency executives: Percy E. Foxworth, 1st Chief; Jerome Doyle, 2nd Chief
- Parent Bureau: Federal Bureau of Investigation

The Special Intelligence Service (SIS) was a covert counterintelligence branch of the United States Federal Bureau of Investigation (FBI) which operated in the Western Hemisphere, and primarily in Latin America during World War II. It was established to monitor the activities of Nazism in the Americas and pro-Nazi groups in Central and South America. SIS also investigated and collected Intelligence on agents of the Spanish Falange, the COMINTERN, and the Abwehr. The organization was a forerunner to the Central Intelligence Agency.

== History ==
In 1934, US President Franklin D. Roosevelt became concerned about the activities of Nazi groups within the United States. The FBI was ordered to begin investigating these groups operating within the country. The goal of this work was to determine if foreign agents were working within these pro-Nazi groups. In 1940, the government decided to expand the scope of this mission. There were more than 1.5 million expatriate/ethnic Germans living in South America, including Argentina and Brazil. As a result, this area had become an active area of Axis espionage, propaganda and sabotage. In June 1940, Roosevelt ordered the formation of the Special Intelligence Service to monitor these activities.

It is commonly assumed that Assistant Director Percy E. "Sam" Foxworth was the first Chief of the SIS. He and SIS agent Harold Dennis Haberfeld died in a plane crash on 15 January 1943. The second Chief appears to have been Jerome Doyle.

The front for the organization was a law firm, the Importers and Exporters Service Company, which operated out of room 4332 of the International Building, from August 1940. The organization took some time to become fully operational, due to language and cultural differences, but within a year the SIS had a number of agents in place under various covers.

Following the war the SIS was disbanded, having been in operation in 1940–1946. After it was disbanded, its region of operation was incorporated into the responsibilities of the newly formed Central Intelligence Agency. Concurrently, the FBI would expand its own primarily domestic counterintelligence role to hunt spies and combat espionage.

== Activities ==
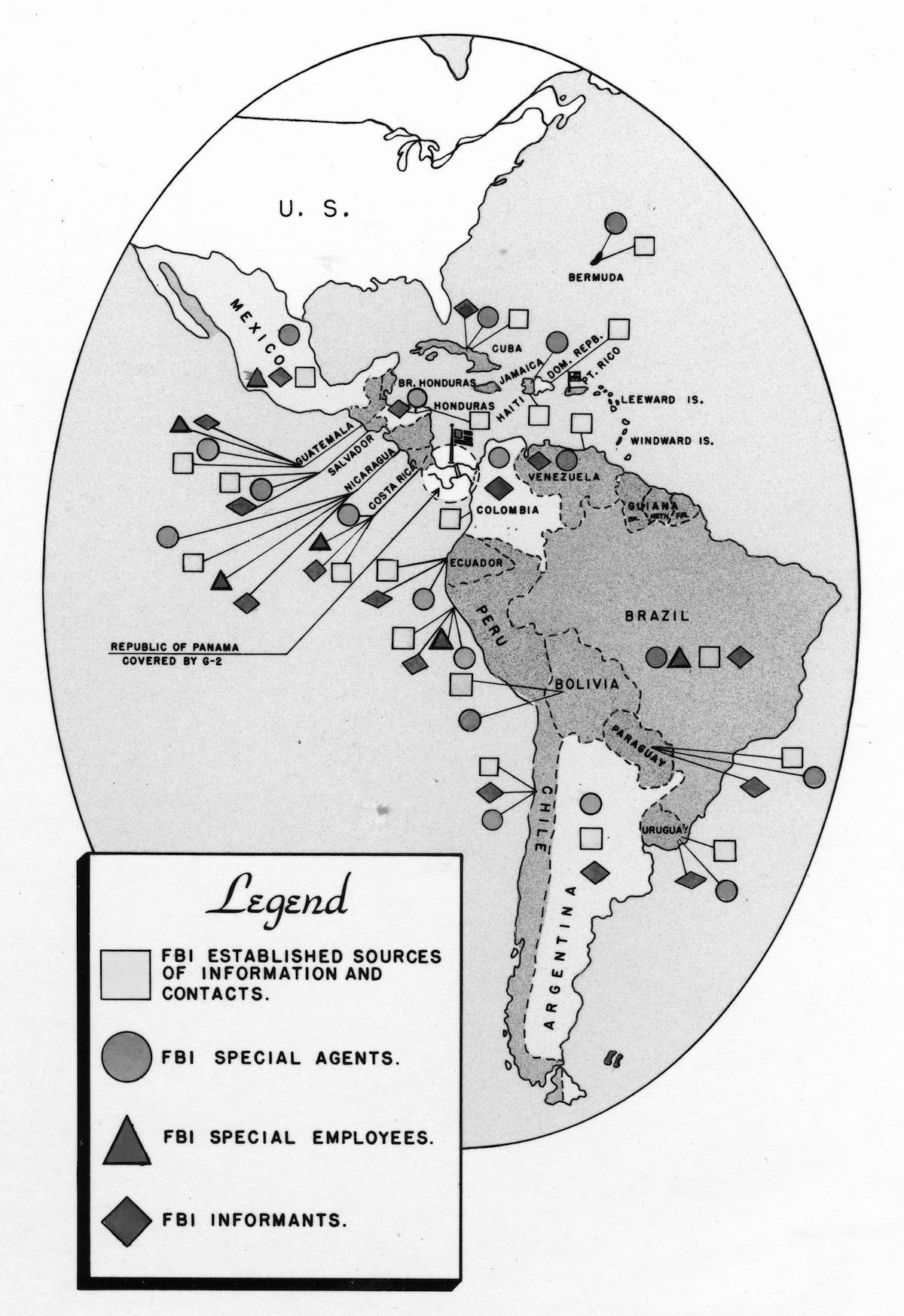
SIS operated primarily in the Western Hemisphere, and Hoover arranged it to be that in areas where the SIS operated, the Office of Strategic Services (OSS) was not allowed to operate.

This organization placed more than 340 undercover agents in regions of Latin America. They operated for seven years, and by 1946 a total of 887 Axis spies had been discovered. Also found were 281 agents of Axis propaganda, 222 smugglers shipping important war materials, and more than 100 saboteurs and other operatives. It located 24 secret Axis radio stations and confiscated 40 radio transmitters and 18 receiving sets.

In Latin America, the SIS worked with the Basque Intelligence Service (BIS), which had been established by Spanish Basques, living in exile as a result of the Spanish Civil War.

=== Argentina ===
The SIS oversaw the destruction of the Abwehr radio HDZ, which transmitted messages to Nazi receiving stations in Europe. It was instrumental in breaking the code of the German Enigma machine.

=== Bolivia ===
An investigation labeled the "Jar case" remains classified.

=== Chile ===
German radio transmitter PQZ was silenced. Guiflermo Hellemann, one of the leader of the spy and sabotage ring was deported to the United States and interrogated.

=== Colombia ===
The apprehension of a German agent in Colombia led to the identification of German agents in the United States.

=== Cuba ===
The SIS report:

Dating from the election of President Ramón Grau San Martin in June, 1944, the Cuban Government experienced a complete turnover in the administration of its executive, military and police branches. Under the Batista government, SIS personnel in Cuba had established a close, efficient liaison with officials of the Cuban National Police, which afforded the Bureau perhaps better coverage in Cuba than in any other Latin American nation. Most of these officials were forced into exile with the change in government, but SIS representatives have been very successful in building new contacts and establishing effective relationships with the new government and police officials so that coverage in Cuba is still excellent.

The political situation in Cuba is unsettled at present, principally due to the inability of the Grau administration to solve shortages in meat, milk and other essentials. One of the most unique results of the reported inefficiency of the Grau administration is the present shortage of sugar in Cuba, which has necessitated the freezing of all sugar supplies until a system can be devised whereby the Cuban people will receive a sufficient supply. Internal dissension within Grau ranks has been evidenced by the open enmity of his revolutionary adherents for his so-called "Palace Clique" which is led by Chief of Police Jose Carreno (Fiallo), Sub-Secretary of Defense Luis Collado and Army Chief of Staff General Genovevo Perez. The revolutionary groups have served notice on Grau that they consider this clique is responsible for blocking the "true revolution" in Cuba, and if not eliminated, the revolutionaries will be forced to take things in their own hands. On April 24, 1945, Erique Enriquez, head of the Cuban Palace Secret Police which serves as a bodyguard to the President, was murdered in downtown Havana by three assailants who machine-gunned him from a passing automobile. It was generally acknowledged the assailants were members of the revolutionary group, and the murder was a warning to Grau that the revolutionaries would stop at nothing to accomplish their ends. It is of interest to note that Enriquez, who was assassinated at 10:30 a.m. had a luncheon engagement for 1:00 p.m. with our Legal Attache on the same day.

The revolutionary groups in Cuba are the offspring of numerous secret organizations formed in 1932 and 1933 to combat the dictatorship of former Cuban President Gerardo Machado. Ramon Grau San Martin, a professor in the University of Havana Medical School at that time, was regarded as a true exponent of the principles professed by these revolutionary organizations. Throughout the succeeding years, the revolutionary groups have opposed the various administrations set up in Cuba, and have resorted to blackmail, kidnapping and terrorist activities in the name of the "sacred revolution." Under the Batista administration, a special Police unit, under Major Mariano Faget, was established to control these elements, and numerous revolutionaries were arrested and convicted of violent crimes. These same elements, through their continued support of Grau San Martin, are now in control of many branches of the Cuban government, and although it is stated that Grau is not in favor of their violent methods, he is reportedly unable to restrain them successfully.

The SIAE Division (Servioio de Investigaciones de Actividades Enemigas) of the Cuban National Police, which is the branch with which Bureau personnel has cooperated closely in its hemispheric security program, was under the control of Major Mario Salabarria during the past year. Salabarria, although he is a revolutionary with no previous police experience, proved to be a valuable source of information and was most cooperative with our representatives in Cuba. President Grau, himself, advised our Legal Attache that it was his intention to establish the Cuban Police as an efficient, military, non-political organization similar to the Federal Bureau of Investigation.

Throughout the year, numerous cases within the primary jurisdiction of the Bureau have been referred to SIS personnel in Havana. During the last eight months of the fiscal year, twenty-four Selective Service cases have been forwarded to Cuba for investigation. Other Federal violations which have been handled by SIS personnel in Cuba included White Slave Traffic Act cases, Passport and Visa matters, Impersonation, Custom Laws and Smuggling, NSPA, UFAP, Servicemen's Dependence Allowance Act, Illegal Wearing of the Uniform, Theft of Government Property, Federal Reserve Act, Censorship Violations and others. In February, 1945, one Thomas Desmord Paul Manion, a Canadian national, was apprehended by Cuban National Police at the request of our Legal Attache, due to the numerous conflicting stories he had told concerning his background and because he had in his possession documentation made out in several different names as well as both R.C.A.F. and United States Naval uniforms. Inquiry of the Bureau reflected Manion was a fugitive from process issued by the United States Commissioner at Newark, New Jersey, for illegally wearing the uniform of a friendly power, i.e., Canada. Further investigation at Miami, Florida, reflected subject had stolen the United States Naval property, had illegally worn the uniform of a Canadian officer in Florida and had married (name redacted) of Summit, New Jersey, under an alias and succeeded in getting his wife to withdraw her savings of approximately $1200 which subject promptly spent. Arrangements were made to return the subject to the United States, where he was sentenced to sixteen months' imprisonment by the Federal Court at Miami, Florida on June 1, 1945. Deportation proceedings are pending against the subject after he serves his prison sentence.

Prior to the termination of the European war, the SIS personnel in Havana maintained an extensive Foreign Travel Control program, which was closely coordinated with the program established by the Bureau. Members of the Office of the Legal Attache, in conjunction with Cuban Police agents, interviewed all passengers arriving in Cuba from Europe and forwarded interrogation reports to the Bureau. These passengers disembarked in Havana from Spanish vessels which arrived every six weeks carrying an average of 150 passengers to Cuba on each trip. Passengers were interrogated for data of value to the war effort, as well as information concerning their background, political sympathies and reason for travel to this hemisphere. The Havana office also prepares memoranda regarding passengers proceeding by air from Havana to Miami, Florida, which are forwarded directly to the Miami Field Division so these data are available when the passengers arrive. The names of all passengers embarking at Havana for Europe on Spanish vessels are searched against our Havana office indices and arrangements are made for the interrogation of those passengers concerning whom derogatory information is recorded.

(paragraph redacted)

Informant coverage on Communist matters in Cuba has been very productive and of great value to the Bureau, inasmuch as Cuba is the center of extensive Communist activities. For a time, it appeared that the administration of President Grau San Martin would curb the Communist influence over the Cuban labor unions, but the control of the Confederacion de Trabajadores de Cuba (which effectively dominates practically all the Cuban labor unions) has remained in Communist hands, and recently, the Grau Government has allotted $725,000 for the construction of a Cuban labor palace. This has been regarded as a payment to the Communists for their continued support of the present administration. Russian diplomatic representatives have been very active in promoting cultural and propaganda activities in Cuba directed at the intellectual elements as well as the Cuban masses. Extensive coverage is being maintained on this phase of Communist activities. (More complete data on Communist matters in Cuba may be found in the section of this report dealing with Communism).

=== Paraguay ===
On 31 March 1945, Special Agent Jeremiah Cordes Delworth was "presently serving" as the FBI Legal Attaché in Asuncion, Paraguay. He died in a plane crash on 3 December 1945 near Laguna Ibera, Santo Tome, Corrientes Provence, Argentina. The Argentine Death Certificate gives the names of Gordon Brittain Whelplay and Richard William Scheitzer as witnesses.

The aircraft of the crash was a U.S. Army C-47, No. 8602. According to Argentine reports, bad weather was the cause. Fourteen were killed in the crash. The flight was from Asuncion to Montevideo, Uruguay. The pilot was Lt. Orville Mitchelsen of California and 3 crew members. The other military victims were Lt. Zane Glicher of Massilon, Ohio; Lt. Chester Lowe of Washington, D. C.; Lt. William Nunnemaker of Kansas; Lt. Ruben Klein of New York; Sgt. James Roberson of St. Louis, Mo.; Sgt. Clarence Setko of Superior, Wis.; Sgt. Richard Schweitzer of Gloversvflle, N. Y.; Cpl. Frank Dubinskas of MeKees Rocks, Pa.; Cpl. David Kellogg of Newtonville, Mass.; Charles Brown and E. S. King, crew members, and (first name unavailable) Leopold. The burned aircraft was found in rough country twenty-three miles south of the hamlet of Pellegrini.

The purpose of the military passengers was a U.S. Army "geodetic mission". A geodetic mission collects Geodetic datum.

It was deemed too difficult to recover the bodies and a gasoline can was parachuted to the search party that located the wrecked plane for the purpose of cremation.

=== Venezuela ===
Ten sabotage agents were interned in the town of Rubino by the Venezuelan government.

Special Agent Robert Howard Calhoun arrived in Venezuela on his first SIS assignment on February 18, 1943. He was assigned as Vice Consul in Ciudad Bolivar, Venezuela, as a cover story. While in Ciudad Bolivar, Agent Calhoun handled investigations involving espionage, sabotage, subversive activity and diamond smuggling.

After ten months, he was transferred to Caracas as Assistant Legal Attache. In January, 1944, all cases relating to political and Communist activity were assigned to him. Thomas J. Maleady, Second Secretary of the United States Embassy, was dependent upon Calhoun's reports for his information.

Calhoun developed contacts and confidential informants. Many contacts and confidential informants developed by him in Ciudad Bolivar continued to furnish him with information, although he was not able to contact then personally while in Caracas.

Calhoun led and directed raids against fascists and participated in dangerous assignments. He later transferred to the New York City FBI division, probably around October 1944.

=== Germany ===
The Safehaven Project identified the transfer of capital out of Germany.

== See also ==
- The Office of Special Investigations was a unit within the Criminal Division of the United States Department of Justice which detects and investigates individuals who took part in state sponsored-acts committed in violation of public international law, such as crimes against humanity. The OSI primarily focused on acts by Nazis abroad before and during World War II, and who subsequently entered, or seek to enter, the United States illegally or fraudulently. However, in 2010, the Office was merged with the Domestic Security Section to form a new unit of the Criminal Division: the Human Rights and Special Prosecutions Section.
