= Anti-Communist Legion of the Caribbean =

Anti-Communist Foreign Legion of the Caribbean
- Legión Anticomunista del Caribe
- Leader: Rafael Trujillo (Dominican dictator)
- Dates active: 1959–1961
- Headquarters: Santo Domingo, Dominican Republic
- Active regions: Antilles
- Ideology: Right-wing politics Anti-communism
- Wars: Cold War

The Anti-Communist Foreign Legion of the Caribbean (Spanish: Legión Extranjera Anticomunista del Caribe, LAC) was an anti-Castroist right-wing paramilitary group based in the Dominican Republic funded by the dictator Rafael Trujillo of the Dominican Republic. The purpose of the group was to overthrow the government of Fidel Castro in Cuba. It was dissolved in August 1961 following Trujillo's death.

The group was made up of Spaniards, Cubans, Croatians, Germans, Greeks and right-wing mercenaries trained in the Dominican Republic. A military invasion from Dominican Republic to Cuba with about 300 soldiers was a failed attempt to overthrow Castro in August 1959.

A different organisation called the Anti-Communist League later had its headquarters at Guy Banister's New Orleans office. The same location appeared on Fair Play for Cuba Committee leaflets distributed by Lee Harvey Oswald and such references to the league are often made in texts concerning conspiracy theories relating to Kennedy assassination. However the Legion and League were separate organisations with no apparent connection except in their opposition to Castro's Cuba.
