= Operation Bolívar =

WWII German espionage in Latin America

- Part of the American Theater of World War II
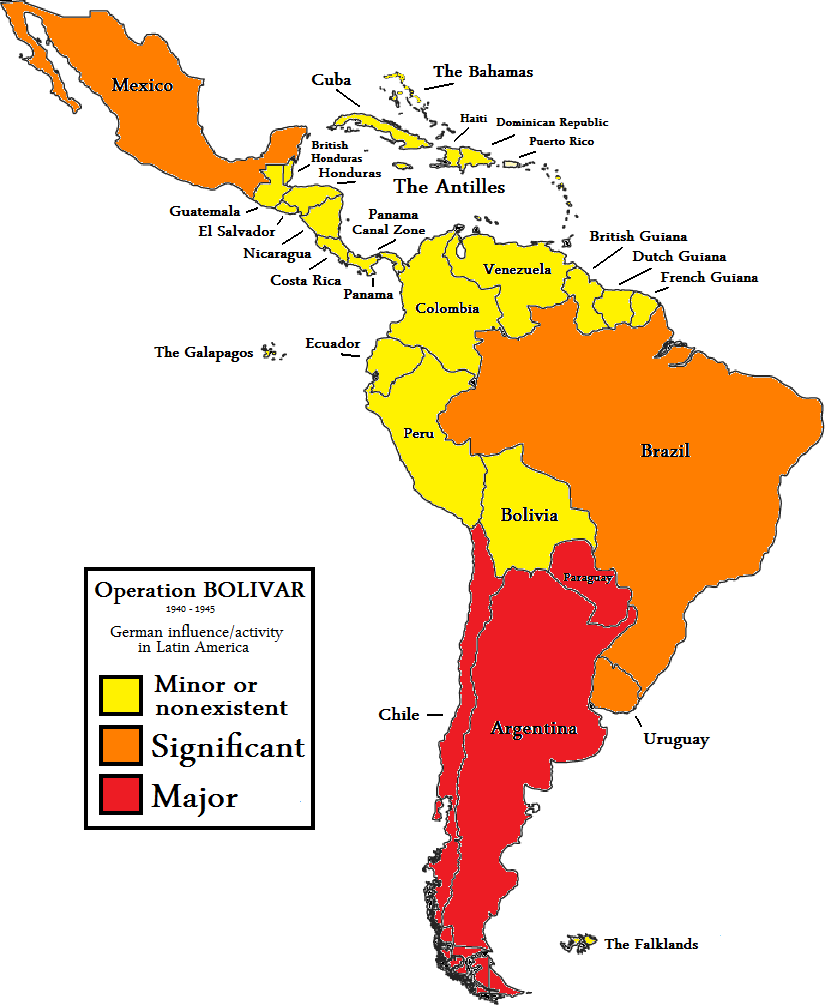
- Location: Latin America
- Objective: Establishment and operation of clandestine communications between Latin America and Europe
- Date: 1940 – 1945
- Executed by: Nazi Germany
- Outcome: German failure: Panama Canal remains open; Sabotage of Chilean copper mines thwarted; Majority of Latin American nations join the Allies; Argentina does not join the Axis.

Operation Bolívar was the codename for the German espionage in Latin America during World War II. It was under the operational control of Section D (4) from the Foreign Security Service (Ausland-SD), and was primarily concerned with the collection and transmission of clandestine information from Latin America to Europe. Overall, the Germans were successful in establishing a secret radio communications network from their control station in Argentina, as well as a courier system involving the use of Spanish merchant vessels for the shipment of paper-form intelligence.

Argentine authorities arrested most of the German agents operating in their country in mid-1944, ending all effective Bolívar activity. Furthermore, the information collected during the operation is believed to have been more useful to the Allies, who intercepted much of the secret transmissions, than to Germany. It also swayed key power brokers of the region out of neutrality and into the American sphere, namely Mexico and Brazil, but also strategically positioned nations producing much needed goods such as Venezuela (oil), Chile (copper), Peru (cotton) and Colombia (platinum).

== Operations ==
=== Early activity ===
Johannes Siegfried Becker (codename: Sargo) was the main figure in the operation and the man personally responsible for organizing most of the intelligence gathering in Latin America. Becker was first sent to Buenos Aires in May 1940, originally with orders to commit sabotage, along with his partner, Heinz Lange (Jansen), who arrived in the country shortly thereafter. After protests from the German embassy in Argentina in August 1940, the objective of the operation was revised to one of espionage only. Becker and Lange were soon discovered by Argentine authorities, so they moved their operations to Brazil, where they met with Gustav Albrecht Engels (Alfredo), another German spy and the owner of the General Electric Company in Krefeld. Engels was originally recruited by the Abwehr, the German military's intelligence agency, in 1939 to collect and transmit economy-related intelligence from the Western Hemisphere to Germany. Engels established a radio station in São Paulo, the CEL, and used a radio transmitter owned by his electric company to relay information acquired by agents in both Brazil and the United States. When Becker arrived in São Paulo, he transformed Engels' operation into an organization that reported on all subjects of interest to German intelligence. This meant that, in addition to collecting economy-related information, the agents collected information about shipping, war production, military movements in the United States, and political and military affairs in Brazil.

Although Bolívar was a Security Service project in origin, many of the agents responsible for collecting information were part of the Abwehr. One of the Abwehr spies in the United States that frequently traveled to Brazil to speak with Engels was Dušan Popov (Ivan), who was one of the most successful British double agents during the war. Other important Bolívar spies included the German naval and air attaché in Chile, Ludwig von Bohlen (Bach); the naval attaché in Rio de Janeiro, Hermann Bohny (Uncle Ernest); the military attaché in Buenos Aires, General Niedefuhr; and the naval attaché in Buenos Aires, Captain Dietrich Niebuhr (Diego), who headed the espionage organization in Argentina. In mid-1941, Herbert von Heyer (Humberto) joined the organization to provide maritime intelligence.

=== Argentina ===
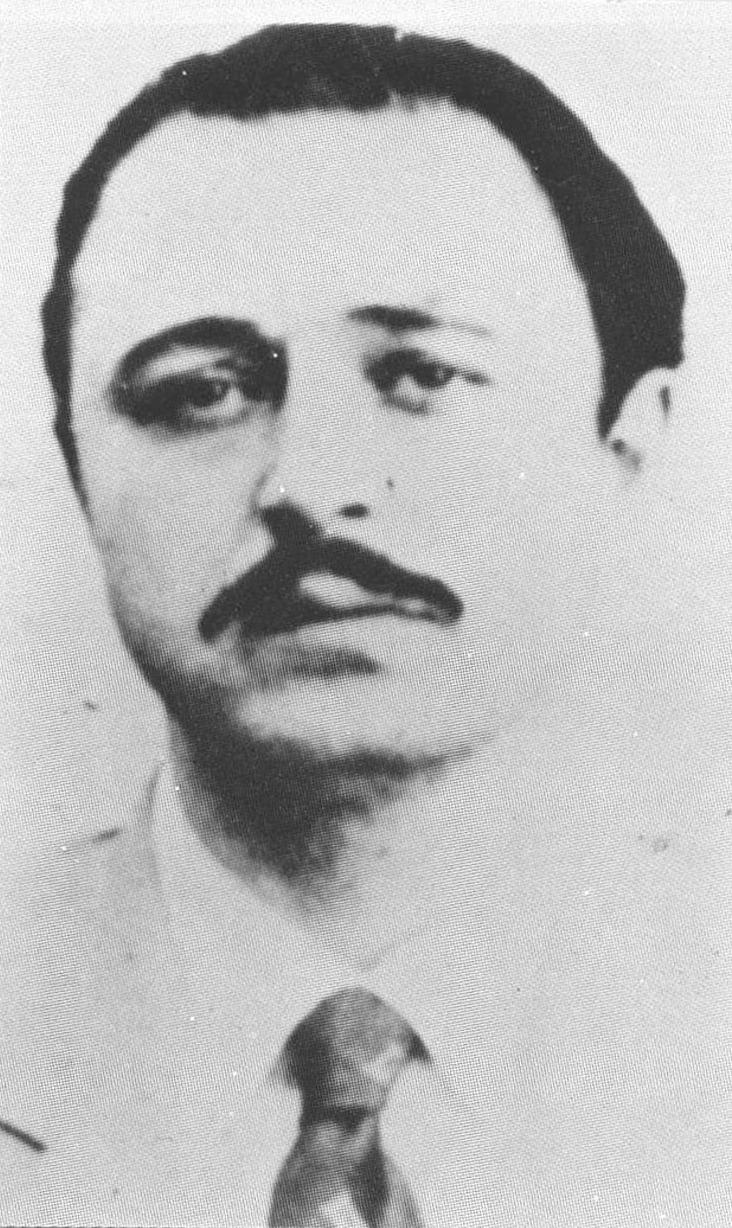
An NSA photograph of Johannes Siegfried Becker

Significant German espionage activity in Brazil ended in March 1942, when Brazilian authorities rounded up all suspected enemy agents. Becker was not in country, having returned to Germany to meet with his superiors. During this time Becker was put in charge of all German espionage activities in South America, which centered around radio communications, and ordered to make Buenos Aires his control station for communicating directly with Berlin, while also opening up smaller stations in other South American countries, which would relay information to the control station. Heinz Lange, who had escaped Brazil to Paraguay before the arrests, was ordered to organize a spy network in Chile, and Johnny Hartmuth (Guapo), a Department VID 2 agent who had also escaped Brazil, was sent to organize a network in Paraguay. An agent named Franczok (Luna), was put in charge of the radio network that was to be established.

In 1943, American radio-monitoring personnel John F. de Bardeleben and Francis M. McDermott operated in Buenos Aires to locate clandestine transmitters. Due to German radio operators frequently relocated their transmitters—sometimes every two to three days—the monitoring team determined that two radio direction-finding units were insufficient to pinpoint the signals and recommended deploying at least four additional mobile units. However, American embassy officials expressed concern that a larger, more visible monitoring operation could create diplomatic difficulties with the Argentine government.

=== Paraguay ===
In February 1943, after considerable difficulty, Becker managed to return to Argentina as a stowaway on a ship traveling from Spain to Buenos Aires. Lange, Hartmuth, and Franczok, who airmailed one transmitter to Paraguay before leaving Brazil, established a temporary station at Asunción, and reestablished contact with Berlin. After receiving Becker's orders, Franczok moved to the new control station in Buenos Aires in May 1943, Lange proceeded to Chile, and Hartmuth was left in Paraguay. Becker hoped to establish clandestine radio stations in every South American republic, but was successful only in Paraguay, Chile, and Argentina.

=== Brazil ===
Engels' group was not the only one active in Brazil. Three other clandestine radio stations, each serving a different spy net, began operating in the country in 1941. In May, Rio de Janeiro's LIR radio station started communicating with MAX in Germany. The LIRMAX group, as it was called, eventually expanded to operate in Brazil and in Argentina, Uruguay, and Ecuador. It was centered on a commercial information service, the Informadora Rapida Limitada (RITA), which was managed by Herbert O. J. Muller (Prinz). The radio station was run by Friedrich Kemper (Koenig). Von Heyer, who also worked with Engels' CELALD group as Humberto, was Vesta in the LIRMAX group.

There were other overlaps of personnel as well, because both groups cooperated extensively with each other. Von Heyer's cover was his job with the Theodore Wille Company, several of whose employees were involved in another spy net centered on station CIT in Recife. The CIT group began operations in June 1941, but was only active in Brazil. A third smaller group, consisting of two agents, Fritz Noak and Herbert Winterstein, was located between Santos and Rio de Janeiro. It communicated with Germany's LFS station, but was only operational from September 1941 to January 1942. It was also not connected with the CELALD-LIRMAX-CIT groups.

To counter clandestine German radio transmissions, Brazil participated in Allied counterintelligence efforts. This effort expanded when Federal Communications Commission (FCC) monitoring officer Robert D. Linx arrived in Rio de Janeiro on March 20, 1942, to help organize a Brazilian radio monitoring service. With American assistance, Brazilian authorities established the Posto Radio Escuta (PRE) network, with its central station in Rio de Janeiro. By the end of May 1942, seven monitoring stations were operating across the country. By August, the network employed seven chief operators and 63 first-class radio operators. The Brazilian Department of Posts and Telegraphs was responsible for operating the PRE network.

The Brazilian monitoring network consisted of seven stations located in Rio de Janeiro, São Paulo, Porto Alegre, Belo Horizonte, Natal, Recife, and Belém. Each station maintained continuous, around-the-clock operations, with staffing increased during periods of heavy radio traffic. In July 1942, the monitoring service expanded its analytical capabilities when retired Brazilian naval officer A. Pinheiro de Andrade joined the effort as a cryptanalyst.

According to National Security Agency historian David P. Mowry, the cooperation also led to a significant intelligence-security breach. After decrypted German messages were supplied to Brazilian officials to assist with investigations, authorities showed the decrypts to detained German agents during questioning. German intelligence subsequently altered its communications systems, a shift that Mowry attributes to the likely exposure of Allied cryptanalytic capabilities.

=== Chile ===
When Lange went to Chile, there was already an agent organization and radio station in operation, so Lange fitted himself into it as an independent operator with his own sources. The station, using callsign PYL to communicate with REW in Germany, had been established in April or May 1941, apparently by Ludwig von Bohlen and Friedrich von Schulz Hausman (Casero). By February 1942, reports were being passed from agents in Chile, Peru, Colombia, Ecuador, Guatemala, Mexico, and the United States. The major figures in the organization were von Bohlen in Santiago; Bruno Dittman (Dinterin), the actual head of the network, in Valparaíso; Friedrich von Schulz Hausman, in Buenos Aires; and George Nicolaus (Max), in Mexico. The PYLREW net's tie with Operation Bolívar was revealed through intercept, particularly in July 1941, when von Bohlen was instructed by radio to contact von Heyer in Rio de Janeiro to obtain a supply of secret inks and developers which von Bohlen had ordered from Germany.

The PYLREW organization was centered on the Compañía Transportes Marítimos ("COTRAS"), formerly a branch of Norddeutscher Lloyd. Von Schulz Hausman had been the manager of the Norddeutscher Lloyd Shipping Agency in Chile before moving to Argentina, and had been succeeded in that job by Dittman. Other PYLREW personnel who had been associated with Norddeutscher Lloyd were Hans Blume (Flor), a radio technician at PYL, and Heinrich Reiners (Tom), who had worked for Norddeutscher Lloyd in Panama before opening a maritime freight office in Valparaiso. Reiners' sister was married to Blume, and Reiners' wife was the drop for the agents of the net.

As result of information collected by American counter-intelligence agencies and given to the Chilean government by the State Department, a number of the more active agents of the Chilean ring were arrested in the fall of 1942. Enough escaped to permit von Bohlen to rebuild another network, known as the PQZ group. When von Bohlen went back to Germany late in 1943, his group was sufficiently well organized so that he could leave it, as well as a large sum of money and equipment, in the hands of Bernardo Timmerman, who carried on until his arrest in February 1944. When Timmerman was arrested, the espionage rings in Chile were "smashed," but again some Germans managed to escape to Argentina, where they continued operating.

Allied and Chilean efforts to track clandestine transmissions in Chile faced significant environmental obstacles, as the country's mountainous terrain and mineral deposits interfered with direction-finding equipment. Monitoring personnel experienced particular difficulty locating clandestine transmitters operating near Valparaíso. To support regional tracking, Station CBA2 at Quintero was jointly staffed by eight U.S. Coast Guard personnel and approximately six to eight members of the Chilean Air Force. According to a subsequent inspection cited by Mowry, the Chilean operators outperformed the U.S. Army personnel who had been assigned to instruct them.

=== Mexico ===
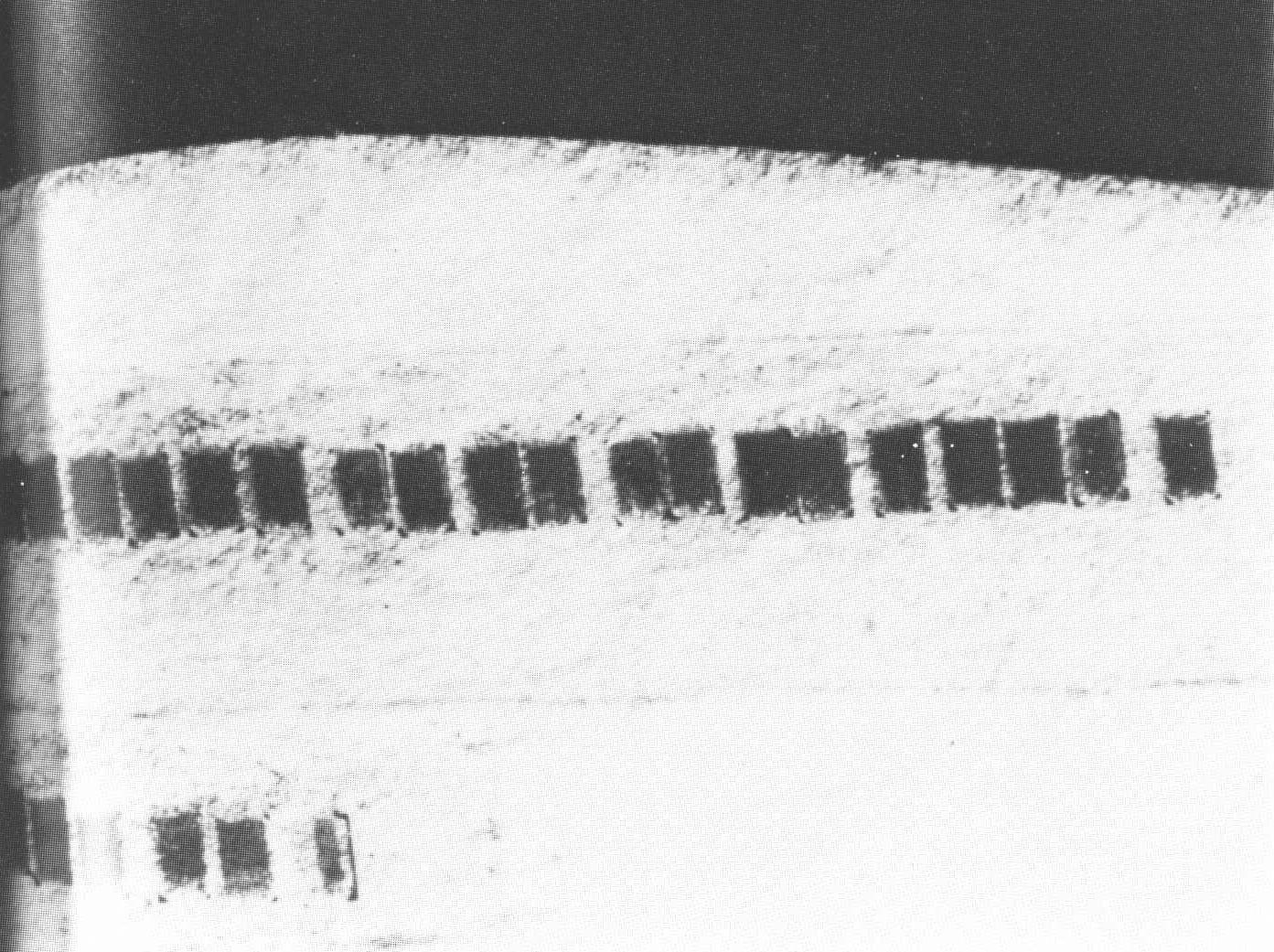
Microdots taped inside the label of an envelope sent by German agents from Mexico City to Lisbon

George Nicolaus was the head of the spy ring in Mexico before his arrest in the spring of 1942. A competent individual, he had served with distinction in the German Army during World War I, spent many years in Colombia, and returned to Germany in November 1938. In January 1939, he was re-commissioned in the Heer and assigned to the Abwehr headquarters in Hanover. Late in 1939, before Operation Bolívar began, Nicolaus was sent to Mexico to establish an espionage network there.

Between 1940 and 1942, Nicolaus organized an extensive network which maintained contact with other spy rings in South America and attempted to obtain information from the United States. While technical data from American publications was extracted or photographed and some general information obtained from contacts in the United States, there is no evidence that Nicolaus was successful in obtaining any vital military secrets. He was successful in leaving behind the nucleus of an organization which was able to maintain some activities throughout the war, although it was of little value to the German war-effort, other than its nuisance value in occupying the attention of Allied counter-intelligence agencies.

Mexico also contributed to the regional Allied radio-monitoring network through station XBTW at Mérida, Yucatán, which was staffed by approximately twelve members of the Mexican Army.

=== Cuba ===
German espionage activity in Cuba was minor, despite the country's importance to the Allied war-effort, and was eliminated by Allied counter-intelligence forces before it could become an effective part of the Bolívar network. To establish a clandestine radio station in Cuba, the Abwehr sent Heinz Lüning to Havana. Lüning was an incompetent spy because he failed to master the basics of espionage. For example, he was never able to get his radio working correctly, he did not understand how to use the secret ink he was supplied, and he missed drop boxes.

In spite of his lack of competence, after his premature arrest in August 1942, Allied officials, including President Fulgencio Batista, General Manuel Benítez, J. Edgar Hoover, and Nelson Rockefeller, attempted to fabricate a link between Lüning and the German submarines operating in the Caribbean, claiming that he was in contact with them via radio, to provide the public with an explanation for their failures early in the U-boat campaign. Accordingly, Allied officials elevated Lüning's importance to that of a "master spy," but there is no evidence that he ever encountered a single piece of important information during his tenure in Cuba. Lüning was found guilty of espionage and executed in Cuba in November 1942, the only German spy executed in Latin America during World War II.

Beyond the Lüning case, the Cuban government participated in broader wartime radio-monitoring efforts. In March 1942, Cuban authorities requested technical equipment from the United States to detect clandestine radio transmissions. Federal Communications Commission official Charles B. Hogg was dispatched to Cuba to assist with the effort; although he constructed direction-finding equipment in December 1942, technical and operational delays meant the unit did not enter continuous operation until June 1943. Assigned the callsign CLQ, the Havana monitoring station was operated by a combination of Cuban military, naval, and civilian personnel as part of the wider Allied network.

=== End of operations ===
The first clandestine information passed from Argentina to Germany concerned finances, the organization of the South American net, Argentine politics, and the establishment of a courier system between Argentina and Spain using crewmen aboard Spanish merchant vessels. Once the network entered full operation, traffic volume increased to as much as fifteen messages a day. In January 1944, the Argentine government arrested several German and Spanish agents, and Becker and Franczok were forced into hiding. Communications between Argentina and Germany were interrupted for about a month. When communications were reestablished, Becker asked Berlin for radio equipment, money, and secret ink materials. This request resulted in Operation Jolle, which eventually turned into a mission not only to resupply Becker's network in South America, but also to establish additional clandestine radio stations in Mexico, the United States, and Central America, which would pass information to Germany via the South American network.

The plan was to have two agents named Hansen (Cojiba) and Schroell (Valiente) deliver the supplies to Buenos Aires via ship, and then travel to Mexico, where they would build a transmitter for communicating with the control station in Argentina. From Mexico, Schroell traveled to the Southwestern United States, where he was supposed to find work in a war plant, and then send the information collected to Hansen in Mexico. Additionally, Schroell and Hansen were to recruit new men for the expansion of the network into the Central American countries. Allied intelligence knew of the plan through intercepts, so in August 1944, shortly after Hansen and Schroell arrived in country, most of the German agents were arrested by Argentine authorities, permanently ending all effective espionage activity by Department VID 4 in the Western Hemisphere. The Germans that managed to escape continued to conduct minor espionage operations in Latin America until the end of the war in 1945, but never again did the amount of clandestine radio traffic return to its former level.

== Assessment ==
Commander L. T. Jones, the head of the United States Coast Guard cryptologic operation in South America, wrote an evaluation of the Allied signals intelligence effort against Operation Bolívar in 1944. He pointed out that the type of information transmitted by an enemy agent depends largely on what happens to be available at his location. Bolívar agents were able to provide reports on the movements of merchant shipping and on local political developments, but the traffic was probably more useful to the Allies than it was to the Germans, because it did reveal the identities of collaborators in the South American countries, including a former Argentine minister of marine and the head of the Paraguayan Air Force. The Allies also were able to obtain from clandestine traffic the details of planning for the December 20, 1943 revolution in Bolivia and another in Chile which was "nipped in the bud." Both of these were backed by Germans working through the Argentine government.

=== Hellmuth Incident ===
In addition to revealing the identities of German spies and sympathizers, the interception of clandestine traffic allowed the Allies to maintain continuity on the agents operating in the Western Hemisphere. This information led to a number of arrests, the most celebrated at the time being that of Osmar Alberto Hellmuth on November 4, 1943. An Argentine naval officer, Hellmuth, unbeknownst to Argentina, was a German collaborator. His control, Hans Harnisch (Boss), claimed to be the personal representative of Heinrich Himmler and had extensive contacts in the highest reaches of the Argentine government. As a result of negotiations between Harnisch and various Argentine officials, including President Pedro Pablo Ramírez and various cabinet ministers, Hellmuth was appointed Argentine consul in Barcelona. This appointment served to cover his actual mission: to proceed to Germany to assure that country that Argentina had no intention of severing relations with her. He was also to confer with the Security Service and other German officials on matters of mutual interest and was to obtain German permission for the return to Argentina from Sweden on the Argentine tanker Buenos Aires, carrying a load of German-supplied weapons.

Most of the details of this planning were known to the Allies through intercepted Bolívar radio traffic. As a consequence, when the SS Cabo de Hornos, aboard which Hellmuth was traveling to Spain, made a routine stop at Trinidad, British authorities arrested him. Argentina made a formal protest to Britain. When the ramifications of the affair were learned, however, there was a change in position. The Argentine minister of foreign affairs instructed his ambassador in London, on December 17, 1943, to inform Great Britain that Hellmuth's appointment had been cancelled and that if the British would release Hellmuth, his letters patent would also be cancelled and the British could then do with him as they saw fit.

In early 1946, when the State Department was preparing a case against the Peronista government of Argentina regarding its wartime support of the Axis, it requested permission to use clandestine Bolívar information, which had been intercepted by Allied intelligence, as part of its evidence. The United States Navy, which was in charge of Allied counter-espionage in South America during World War II, refused to give blanket approval for such usage but a compromise was reached: information from clandestine communications was fused with information from other sources in preparing the indictment. This was Operation Bolívar's final contribution to the Allied war effort.

== See also ==
- Department 50 – Chilean-FBI probe of Nazis in South America
- Latin America during World War II
- Spain in World War II
- British Security Coordination
