= List of wars involving Chile =

This is a list of wars involving the Republic of Chile from its birth in the first decades of the 19th century to the present.

- Chilean victory: in the case of an international war, where a favorable result has been obtained
- Indecisive or inconclusive: in the case of an international conflict, but with an unclear or left to interpretation result or a treaty of peace between two belligerents
- Internal confrontation: in the case of a Chilean internal conflict, whatever the winning faction

== List ==
=== 19th-century ===
Confrontation	Combatant 1	Combatant 2	Results
Spanish American wars of independence (1808–1833): Chilean War of Independence (1812–1826); Chilean participation on: Argentine War of Independence (1810–1818); Peruvian War of Independence (1809–1826); Colombian War of Independence (Note: The Chilean privateer Los Andes attacked the royalist garrisons in different points of the western coast of present-day Colombia between 1819 and 1820, with the aim of supporting General Simón Bolívar's forces that were fighting in the interior.) (1810–1825); Ecuadorian War of Independence (1809–1823); Mexican War of Independence (Note: From 1817, Chilean privateers began to harass Spanish-flagged ships at sea, even reaching the western coasts of Mexico. The same happened with the First Chilean Navy Squadron, commanded by Admiral Thomas Cochrane, who was present circumstantially between 1821 and 1822.) (1810–1821)	Patriots: (States consolidated in war): Chile; Gran Colombia; United Provinces of the Río de la Plata; Mexico; Peru; Bolivia; Federal Republic of Central America; Paraguay; Amerindian allies of the Patriots	Royalists: (Spain) Spanish Monarchy: Spain; Spanish America; Amerindian allies of the Royalists	Victory: End of all Spanish domains in Americas, with the exception of Cuba and Puerto Rico; Formation of the new Hispanic American states; Subsequently, Spain recognizes each of the new Hispanic American states through the signing of international treaties (Note: On 25 April 1844, Spain officially recognized the independence of Chile through a Treaty of Peace and Friendship.)
Chilean patriots conflict (1814)	Government Junta of Santiago under Jose Miguel Carrera	Army in Talca under Bernardo O'Higgins	Carrera victory: O'Higgins recognizes Carrera's authority and they unite to face the royalists again; Military weakening of the patriot cause in the face of the royalist threat
Uprising of the Prieto brothers (1819)	Chilean Government	Montoneras of Prieto brothers	Government victory: Destruction of the montoneras and death of its main leaders
Campaign against Pincheira brothers (1822–1832)	Chile; United Provinces of the Río de la Plata (until 1831); Argentine Confederation (from 1831); Mapuche groups: (support increased since 1830): Abajinos; Pehuenches; Ranqueles; Boroanos	(Spain) Montoneras of Pincheira brothers Mendoza Province (1829–1830): Federals; Mapuche groups: (support decreased since 1830): Pehuenches; Ranqueles; Boroanos	Victory: End of the montoneras of Pincheira brothers and relocation in Chile of the families that lived in the Pincheira camps; The Chilean government pardoned José Antonio, the last leader of the Pincheira; Rural banditry in Chile persists for several years but to a lesser extent; Desert Campaign (1833–1834); Sporadic conflicts in La Frontera (1834–1861)
Chilean Civil War (1829–1830)	Pelucones; Mapuche groups	Pipiolos; Mapuche groups	Pelucones victory: Establishment of the Conservative Republic; Political preponderance of Diego Portales
Mapuche uprising (1834–1837)	Chile; Mapuche ally: Abajinos	Mapuche groups: Arribanos; Huilliches; Costinos; Pehuenches	Victory: Parliament of Boroa between Chile and Mapuche rebels in 1837
Freire's expedition (1836)	Chilean Government	Forces under Ramón Freire	Government victory: Freire's forces are dismantled in Chiloé, and Freire himself is captured and subsequently exiled; Diplomatic and military tension between Chile and the Peru-Bolivian Confederation, and Garrido's raid on Peru
War of the Confederation (1836–1839)	United Restoration: Chile (Peru) Peruvian Dissidents: (Peru) Government of La Fuente (1837); (Peru) Government of Gamarra (1838–39); Argentine Confederation	Peru-Bolivian Confederation (Peru) Orbegoso Government	Victory: Dissolution of the Peru–Bolivian Confederation; The government of the Luis José de Orbegoso is defeated during the course of the war; Restoration of the republics of Peru (unification of the North and South States of Peru) and Bolivia; Exile of Andrés de Santa Cruz; Chile obtains international prestige and the commercial hegemony of Valparaíso in the Pacific; Military tension between Peru and Bolivia; Argentina, after the dissolution of the Peru-Bolivian Confederation, negotiated with Bolivia the recovery of the territory it had lost during the war
Uprising of Quillota (1837)	Chilean Government	Rebels of Quillota	Government victory: The rebels execute the Minister Diego Portales; Defeat of the rebels and execution of their leader, Colonel José Antonio Vidaurre
Iquicha War (Note: After the dissolution of the Peru-Bolivian Confederation, the iquichano leader Antonio Huachaca provoked an armed uprising against the Chilean-Peruvian victors. Chilean troops fought against these rebels until peace was achieved.) (1839)	Chile; Peru	Rebels of Iquicha	Victory: Signature of the Treaty of Yanallay in which the Iquichanos submit to the Republic of Peru; Isolation of the caudillo Antonio Huachaca
Chilean Revolution (1851)	Chilean Government	Liberal Rebels; Mapuche: Mañil Clan	Government victory: Survival of the conservative government; Repression and exile of intellectuals and liberal politicians
Chilean Revolution (1859)	Chilean Government	Liberal Rebels; Mapuche	Government victory: Temporary survival of the conservative government; Exile of the liberal Pedro León Gallo until 1863; Presidential candidacy of José Joaquín Pérez, who was elected and started the Liberal Republic in 1861; The Radical Party of Chile emerged in 1863 from the seed of the revolution
Mapuche uprising (1859–1861)	Chile; Mapuche ally: Abajinos	Mapuche groups: Arribanos; Huilliches; Costinos; Pehuenches	Victory: Chile decides to occupation of Araucanía
Occupation of Araucanía (1861–1883)	Chile	Mapuche	Victory: Incorporation of Araucanía into Chile; The Mapuche groups are concentrated in land reductions; Entry of Chileans and European immigrants into the territory; Infrastructure build-up in the territory; Violence and lawlessness in the areas for decades are generated
Chincha Islands War (1865–1871)	Chile; Peru; Ecuador; Bolivia	Spain	Indecisive, both sides claimed victory: Spanish withdrawal from the Chincha Islands; Decline of the Chilean merchant fleet and subsequent resurgence; The state of war is maintained between the belligerent parties until the signing of an indefinite armistice in 1871; Subsequently, Spain and the South American allies signed peace treaties separately: Peru (1879), Bolivia (1879), Chile (1883) and Ecuador (1885)
War of the Pacific (1879–1883)	Chile	Peru; Bolivia	Victory: Signing of the Treaty of Ancón between Chile and Peru in 1883; Signing of the Treaty of Valparaiso between Chile and Bolivia in 1884; Bolivia becomes de facto and de jure landlocked; Peruvian Civil War of 1884–1885; Saltpeter becomes Chile's main source of wealth for several years; Emergence of the military and political influence of Chile in South America; Tension between Chile and Argentina due to the dispute over the Puna de Atacama; Rivalry between Chile and the United States (Note: During the course of the War of the Pacific, the United States intervened diplomatically in favor of Peru and Bolivia, trying to avoid the territorial cession in favor of Chile. This generated an atmosphere of tension or rivalry between both countries, especially because Chile emerged as a regional power after the war. The greatest example of this struggle between Chile and the United States was the Panama crisis of 1885.)
Chilean Civil War (1891)	Chilean Government	Congressist Junta	Congressist victory: Suicide of President José Manuel Balmaceda; Ascent of Jorge Montt to the presidency; Beginning of the Parliamentary period; The tensions between Chile and the United States during the war led to the Baltimore crisis

=== 20th-century ===
Confrontation	Combatant 1	Combatant 2	Results
Chile Chico War (1918)	(Chile) Businessman Carlos von Flack (Chile) Some contingents of the Army Carabineros Corps (Note: In 1903, the Army Carabineros Corps was created, in charge of exercising internal security functions. This unit belonged to the cavalry branch of the Chilean Army. On 27 April 1927, the Army Carabineros Corps merged with the Fiscal Police, thus forming the current institution known as Carabiniers of Chile.)	Chilean settlers of Chile Chico	Chilean settlers victory: Chilean government annulled the lease with Carlos Von Flack of the lands located on the south bank of the Buenos Aires Lake and recognized the right of Chilean settlers over them; Chilean government analyzes with greater rigor the contracts with exploitation companies; The position of the settlers was strengthened in front of the big exploiting companies during the colonization process of Aysén; The events attracted the interest of many Chileans to settle in these lands
Chilean naval mutiny (1931)	(Chile) Chilean Government	(Chile) Rebels of the Chilean Navy	Government victory: Capitulation of the navy and delivery of the ships to the government authorities; Court-martialed to the mutineers
World War II (1939–1945): American Theater (World War II); Latin America during World War II; Operation Bolívar; Chile during World War II; Relevant milestones regarding Chile: Covert operations against Nazi agents by the PDI through Department 50 (1939–1945); Cooperation with the United States before and after the official entry of Chile into the war; Sinking of the steam Toltén (13 March 1942); Chile broke diplomatic relations with all the Axis powers (20 January 1943); Nominal support of Allied forces in the Battle of the Caribbean; Surveillance, confinement and expulsion of Japanese accused of espionage, and to a lesser extent of Germans and Italians; Chile declared war on Japan (13 April 1945)	United States; Soviet Union; United Kingdom; China; France; Poland; Canada; Australia; New Zealand; India; South Africa; Yugoslavia; Greece; Denmark; Norway; Netherlands; Belgium; Luxembourg; Czechoslovakia; Brazil; Mexico; Chile; Bolivia; Colombia; Ecuador; Paraguay; Peru; Venezuela; Uruguay; Argentina	Germany; Japan; Italy; Hungary; Romania; Bulgaria; Croatia; Slovakia; Finland; Thailand; Manchukuo; Mengjiang	Victory: Collapse of the German Reich; Fall of Japanese and Italian Empires; Creation of the United Nations; Emergence of the United States and the Soviet Union as superpowers; Beginning of the Cold War; With respect to Chile: Department 50 managed to interrupt the activities of German or pro-Nazi agents in Chile and help in other parts of Latin America; Chilean authorities thwart Nazi plots to attack the Panama Canal and mines in northern Chile; Chile becomes a founding member of the United Nations when it was established in 1945.; Chile, as part of the allies, participated in the signing of the Treaty of San Francisco in 1951, which regularized the situation with Japan
Cold War (1947–1991): Armed Resistance in Chile (1973–1990)	(Chile) Chilean Government	Chilean far-left guerrilla groups: MIR; MJL; FPMR	Government victory: The armed groups of the extreme left fail to overthrow the military government; With the national plebiscite of 1988, on 11 March 1990, the end of the military government and the beginning of the transition to democracy took place; The levels of violence carried out by armed groups of the extreme left diminished considerably with the return of democracy, since this fact led to the demobilization of most of them; Several isolated attacks continued, executed by dissident groups
