= Chile during the Second World War =

Chile during World War II
- Celebrations held in Santiago to commemorate the severing of diplomatic relations with the Axis powers
- Location: Chile
- Date: 1939-1945
- Key Events: Seguro Obrero Massacre; Operation Bolívar; Sinking of the Toltén

Chile's participation in the Second World War, similarly to the First World War, was entirely diplomatic, without the use of any military actions; this excludes the participation of Chilean citizens who fought in the armed forces of those parties in the war. In April 1945, the national Congress authorized president Juan Antonio Ríos to declare war on the Axis powers, which he officialized on 13 April, specifically declaring war on the Empire of Japan. However, given the imminent defeat of Japan, he took no military measures to participate in the war. Chile was the final country in the world to join the Allies.

Initially, Chile was neutral in the conflict, wanting to maintain trade relations with both sides. In 1938, the National Socialist Movement of Chile attempted a failed coup'd'tat against the government. In retaliation, president Arturo Alessandri (allegedly) ordered the Chilean Carabineros to storm the Seguro Obero building where many of their members were hiding which resulted in the Seguro Obrero Massacre. In 1941, the Prime Minister, Juan Antonio Ríos, declared Chile's neutrality in the conflict. However, the attack on Pearl Harbor put Chile's neutrality under heavy political strain, In 1942, 'Ríos instructed the Chilean ambassador to the United States to sign the United Nations Declaration of 1 January. Under the agreement, Chile would be belligerent to Japan. In 1942, a Nazi espionage operation was discovered in Valparaíso as part of Operation Bolívar. In response, the government outlawed such activities. From 1941 to 1945, the United States used aid as pressure to convince Chile to join the war and sever relations with the Axis Powers. In 1945, Juan Antonio Ríos, with permission from Congress, declared war on Japan.

== Neutrality of Chile (1939-1943) ==
=== Government of Pedro Aguirre Cerda ===
Chile had an important economic and migratory presence from both sides of World War II. The Germans had carried a large diaspora in Chile for a century, and Jorge González von Marées led the National Socialist Movement of Chile. The British and French also had a large financial, industrial, and media presence in Chile's history.

Pedro Aguirre Cerda had openly declared Chile's neutrality in World War II, however, after the United States entered the war in 1941, the situation became tense in the country as it was economically dependent on its neutrality.

After the Attack on Pearl Harbor, the Minister of Foreign Relations, Juan Bautista Rossetti, urgently called for a meeting between the foreign relations ministers of all American countries. This meeting would be the 1942 Rio de Janeiro Conference, in which the decision would be made to reaffirm the principles of Pan-American solidarity and also recommend a severing of diplomatic relationships with the Axis Powers.

There were multiple reasons for the maintaining of Chile's neutrality: none of the Axis Powers had a motive nor offense to motivate Chile severing relations; the possible threat was Japan, that warned that if Chile broke off relations, they would be "asking for trouble". There was also the fear of being victims of unrestricted submarine warfare with the subsequent economic consequences, and the important social and cultural German diaspora in Chile, which already included Prime Minister Ríos's wife, Marta Ide, who was descended from German settlers. On the other hand, there were ethnic Germans and refugees in Chile who formed the German resistance to Nazism, and also created the Deutsche Blätter, a weekly cultural-political magazine which was opposed to totalitarianism and instead leaned towards classical liberalism. The newspaper was in serialisation between 1943 and 1946.

=== Ríos' Government and American pressure ===
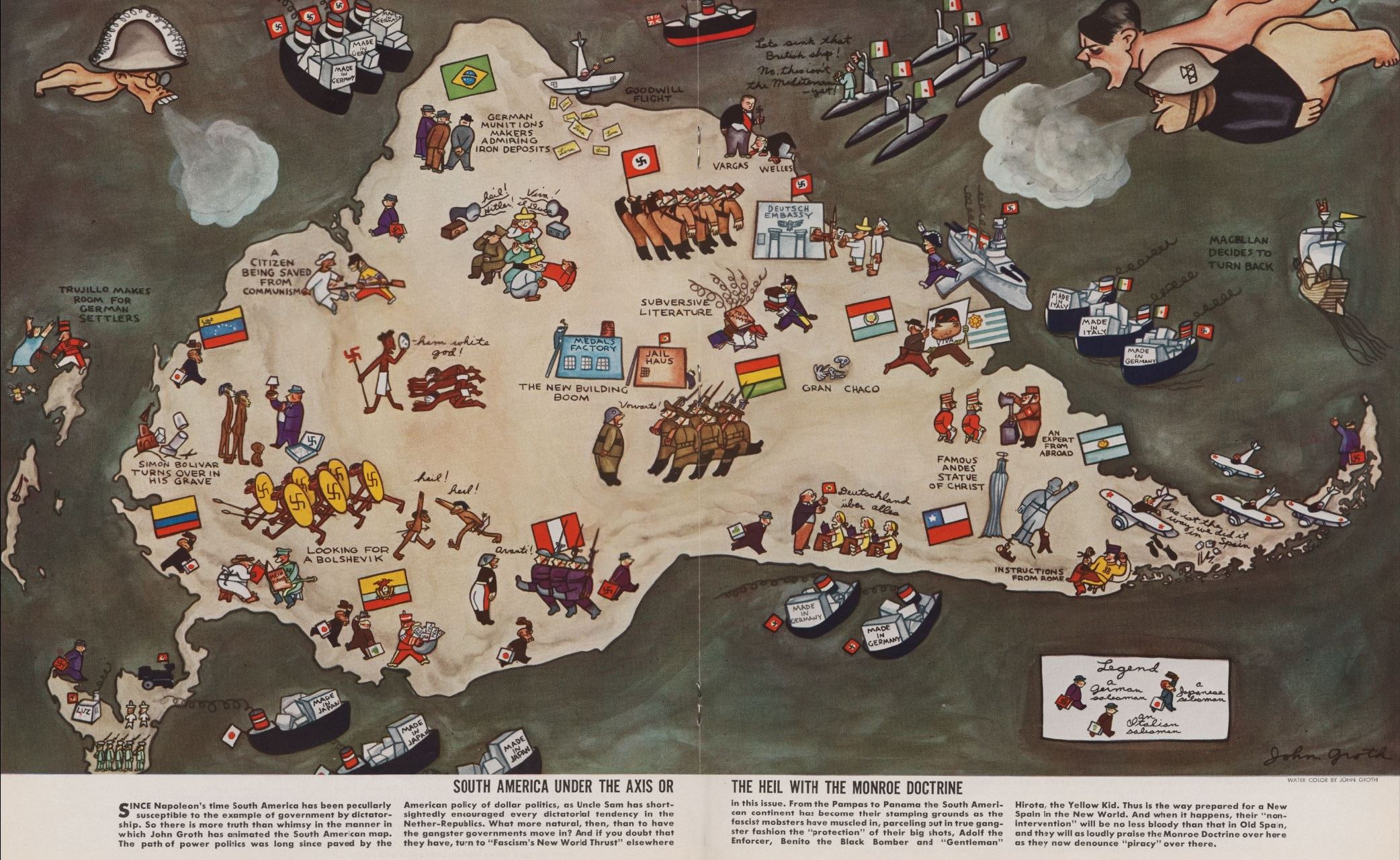
Satirical map from Ken Magazine in 1938 which attacks the commercial, cultural and military intrusion into South America by the Axis Powers.

Chile had taken the decision to remain neutral, although the country did consider the United States as a "non-belligerent" in compliance with its duties of bringing continental solidarity When Juan Antonio Rios assumed the presidency, he decided, alongside his Minister of Foreign Relations, Ernesto Barros Jarpa, to maintain Chile's neutrality.

On 13 March 1942, the Chilean steamship, Toltén, of the South America Steamship Company was sunk on its journey at New Jersey, killing its crew of 27. It was presumed that the ship was sunk by the German submarine U-404, however, because of an order that had been received hours before, the ship sailed without lights that would have allowed it to be identified as neutral.

The United States began a series of pressures on the Chilean government to change its course of neutrality. The United States attacked diplomatically, warning that Chile's neutrality would allow German espionage to be carried out in the country. The Chilean government, for its part, attempted to conditionally abandon its neutrality to obtain a greater military assistance on the part of the United States.

One event in particular soured relations between the two countries. President Franklin D. Roosevelt had sent an invitation to his Chilean counterpart to visit the United States, with the hope that 'Ríos would break relations before his departure.In these circumstances, the acting State Secretary, Sumner Welles, made, on 8 October 1942 a controversial speech, where he warned that Chile and Argentina were: "allowing their territories to be utilized by officials and subversive agents of the Axis, as bases for hostile activities against their neighbours" and continued with: "I cannot believe that these 2 republics would still allow, for a long time, for their American neighbours to be stabbed in the back by Axis emissaries that operate in their territories."

These declarations caused a grand scandal in Chile, hence, the president had to suspend his visit to United States and received the unanimous support of the public in his stance, which drew diverse demonstrations of support, especially from the left-wing of the coalition.

== Alignment with the Allies (1943-1945) ==
=== Breaking of Diplomatic relations with the Axis ===
Welles' information was not entirely exaggerated, as during 1942, they started to dismantle several German espionage networks that were part of Operation Bolivar and hence operated in Chile. Also within the country, the opinion in favor of the rupture of relations with the Axis happened to intensify massively, despite the country's rejection of Welles' speech. The Democratic Alliance demanded to Ríos; the rupture of relations with the Axis and opening of relations with the Soviet Union.

In such circumstances, Ríos had to dispense of Barros Jarpa and replace him with Joaquín Fernández Fernández, a former colleague of the cabinet in the controversial administration of Carlos Dávila. In December, Minister of the Interior Raul Morales, was sent to the United States, who then met with Roosevelt to explain the position of the country and obtain guarantees before rupturing relations.

At the end of 1943, the government, alerted by British espionage, arrested a nationalist group that intended to overthrow the government and restore relations with the Axis. The United States sent the cruiser Trenton to the coast of Valparaiso to intimidate whoever intended to overthrow the Chilean government.

The situation also influenced, in Chile, the initiation of diplomatic and consular relations with one of the principal members of the Allies, the Soviet Union, which were officialized on 11 December 1944 in Washington D.C. Through the intermediary accredited ambassadors of both countries in the United States capital, Marcial Mora Miranda, and Andrei Gromyko.

=== Declaration of War on Japan ===
On the 13th of April 1945, the Ríos' government declared a state of belligerence with the Empire of Japan, with the aim of entering the United Nations, which required a declaration of a war against any Axis Powers. As internationally, this declaration was considered insufficient to meet the requirements, Chile took the step to formally declare war on Japan.

The president sent a bill to the National Congress, to declare war on Japan, which was approved by the Chamber of Deputies on 11 April 1945, with 70 votes in favor and 2 abstentions.Two days later, on 13 April, Ríos' signed together with all of his ministerial cabinet, the decree of the Declaration of War.

Shortly after, in September 1945, World War II was won by the Allies. Chile managed to remain safe from these events and their serious global consequences. Diplomatic relations with Japan were restored in 1950, when the country appointed Katsusito Narita as the country's ambassador to Chile, and with the signing of the Treaty of San Francisco a year later.

== See also ==
- Latin America in World War II
- Parliamentary Republic (Chile)
