= Neutral country =

State that is neutral towards belligerents in a given conflict

World map showing various countries' degrees of neutrality: neutral countries whose neutral status is widely recognized neutral countries whose neutral status is disputed previously neutral countries whose neutral status has since ended

A neutral country is a sovereign state that is neutral towards belligerents in a specific war or holds itself as permanently neutral in all future conflicts (including avoiding entering into military alliances such as NATO, CSTO or the SCO). As a type of non-combatant status, nationals of neutral countries enjoy protection under the law of war from belligerent actions to a greater extent than other non-combatants such as enemy civilians and prisoners of war. Different countries interpret their neutrality differently: some, such as Costa Rica have demilitarized, while Switzerland holds to "armed neutrality", to deter aggression with a sizeable military, while barring itself from foreign deployment.

Not all neutral countries avoid any foreign deployment or alliances, as Austria, Ireland, and Malta have active UN peacekeeping forces and a political alliance within the European Union. Sweden's traditional policy was not to participate in military alliances, with the intention of staying neutral in the case of war. Immediately before World War II, the Nordic countries stated their neutrality, but Sweden changed its position to that of non-belligerent at the start of the Winter War. Sweden would uphold its policy of neutrality until the 2022 Russian invasion of Ukraine. During the Cold War, former Yugoslavia claimed military and ideological neutrality from both the Western and Eastern Bloc, becoming a co-founder of the Non-Aligned Movement.

There have been considerable changes to the interpretation of neutral conduct over the past centuries. In a purely structural view, neutrality can function as a mechanism which counteracts the division of the international system into two opposing blocs (such as Christian versus non-Christian polities, the Capitalist–Communist divide of the Cold War, or possibly an emerging distinction between liberal versus illiberal international order). In this view, neutrality helps in maintaining an environment of segmentation, or of multiple sovereign equals, rather than a stratified structure of a polarization into two mutually hostile sides. Marking a major turning point following the 2022 Russian invasion of Ukraine, Finland and Sweden shelved their policies of neutrality and applied to join NATO on 18 May 2022, Finland became the 31st member on 4 April 2023, and Sweden the 32nd member on 7 March 2024.

== Terminology ==
- A neutral country in a particular war, is a sovereign state which refrains from joining either side of the conflict and adheres to the principle of the Law of Neutrality under international law. Although countries have historically often declared themselves as neutral at the outbreak of war, there is no obligation for them to do so. The rights and duties of a neutral power are largely defined in sections 5 and 13 of the Hague Convention of 1907.
- A permanently neutral power is a sovereign state which is bound by international treaty, or by its own declaration, to be neutral towards the belligerents of all future wars. An example of a permanently neutral power is Switzerland. The concept of neutrality in war is narrowly defined and puts specific constraints on the neutral party in return for the internationally recognized right to remain neutral.
- Neutralism or a "neutralist policy" is a foreign policy position wherein a state intends to remain neutral in future wars. A sovereign state that reserves the right to become a belligerent if attacked by a party to the war is in a condition of armed neutrality.
- A non-belligerent state is one that indirectly participates in a war by politically or materially helping one side of the conflict and thus not participating militarily. For example, it may allow its territory to be used for the war effort. Contrary to neutrality, this term is not defined under international law.

== Rights and responsibilities of a neutral power ==
Belligerents may not invade neutral territory, and a neutral power's resisting any such attempt does not compromise its neutrality.

A neutral power must intern belligerent troops who reach its territory, but not escaped prisoners of war. Belligerent armies may not recruit neutral citizens, but they may go abroad to enlist. Belligerent armies' personnel and materiel may not be transported across neutral territory, but the wounded may be. A neutral power may supply communication facilities to belligerents, but not war material, although it need not prevent export of such material.

Belligerent naval vessels may use neutral ports for a maximum of 24 hours, though neutrals may impose different restrictions. Exceptions are to make repairs—only the minimum necessary to put back to sea—or if an opposing belligerent's vessel is already in port, in which case it must have a 24-hour head start. A prize ship captured by a belligerent in the territorial waters of a neutral power must be surrendered by the belligerent to the neutral, which must intern its crew.

== Recognition and codification ==
Neutrality has been recognised in different ways, and sometimes involves a formal guarantor. For example, Switzerland and Belgium's neutrality was recognized by the signatories of the Congress of Vienna, Austria has its neutrality guaranteed by its four former occupying powers, and Finland by the Soviet Union during the Cold War. The form of recognition varies, often by bilateral treaty (Finland), multilateral treaty (Austria) or a UN declaration (Turkmenistan). These treaties can in some ways be forced on a country (Austria's neutrality was insisted upon by the Soviet Union) but in other cases it is an active policy of the country concerned to respond to a geopolitical situation (Ireland in the Second World War).

For the country concerned, the policy is usually codified beyond the treaty itself. Austria and Japan codify their neutrality in their constitutions, but they do so with different levels of detail. Some details of neutrality are left to be interpreted by the government while others are explicitly stated; for example, Austria may not host any foreign bases, and Japan cannot participate in foreign wars. Yet Sweden, lacking formal codification, was more flexible during the Second World War in allowing troops to pass through its territory.

== Armed neutrality ==
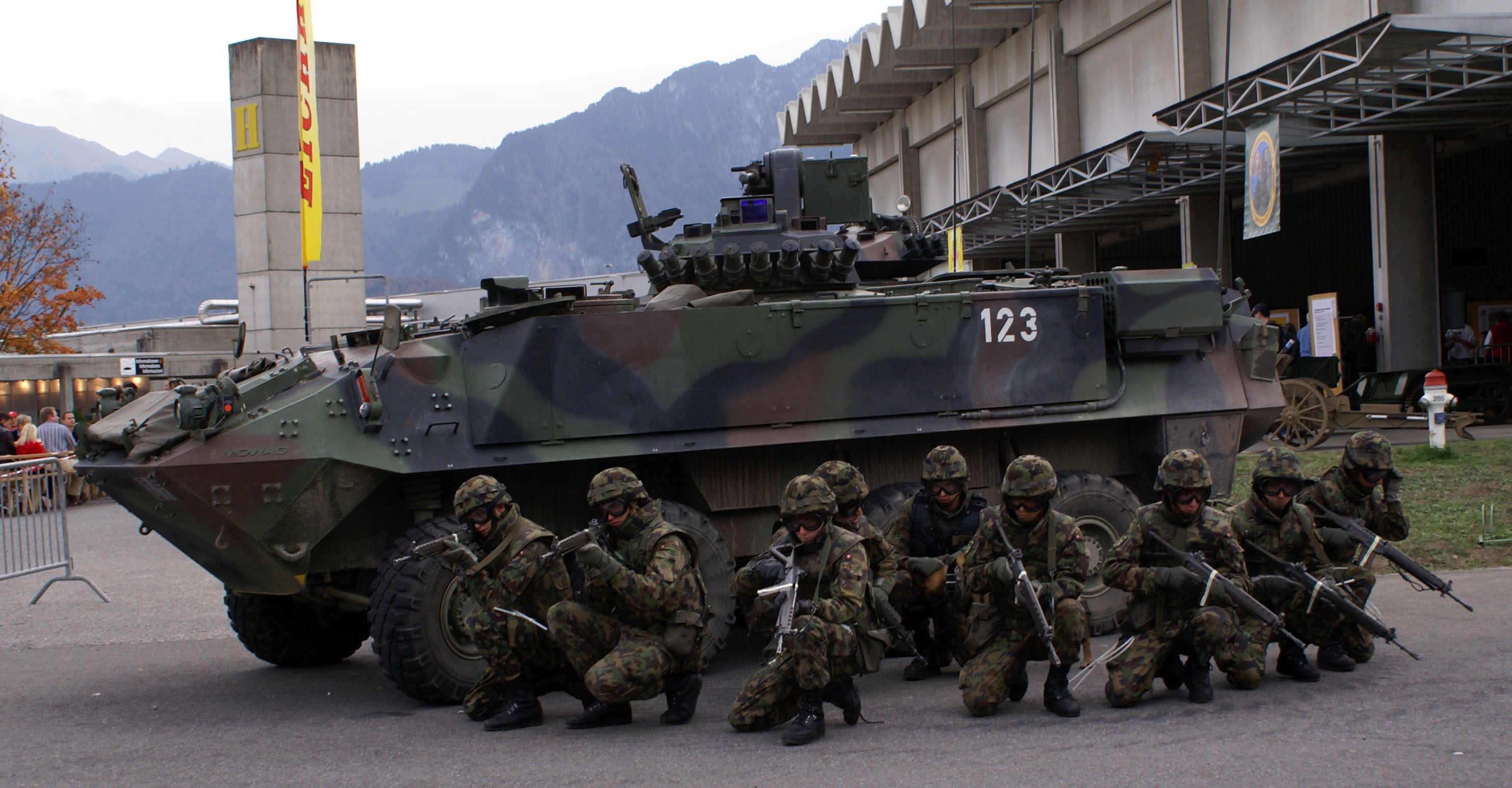
Switzerland is a prominent example of a country outside of any military alliance, but maintaining a strong deterrent force.

Armed neutrality is the posture of a state or group of states that has no alliance with either side of a war but asserts that it will defend itself against resulting incursions from any party, making the benefit to a belligerent of entering the country by force not worth the cost.

This may include:

- Military preparedness without commitment, especially as the expressed policy of a neutral nation in wartime, and the readiness to counter with force an invasion of rights by any belligerent power.
- Armed neutrality is a term used in international politics for the attitude of a state or group of states that makes no alliance with either side in a war. It is the condition of a neutral power during a war to hold itself ready to resist by force, any aggression of either belligerent.
- Armed neutrality makes a seemingly-neutral state take up arms for protection to maintain its neutrality.

The term derives from the historic maritime neutrality of the First League of Armed Neutrality of the Nordic countries and Russia under the leadership of Catherine the Great, which was invented in the late 18th century but has since been used only to refer to countries' neutralities. Sweden and Switzerland are independently of each other famed for their armed neutralities, which they maintained throughout both World War I and World War II. The Swiss and the Swedes each have a long history of neutrality: they have not been in a state of war internationally since 1815 and 1814, respectively. Switzerland continues to pursue, however, an active foreign policy and is frequently involved in peace-building processes around the world. According to Edwin Reischauer, "To be neutral you must be ready to be highly militarized, like Switzerland or Sweden." Sweden ended its policy of neutrality when it joined NATO in 2024.

In contrast, some neutral states may heavily reduce their military and use it for the express purpose of home defense and the maintenance of their neutrality, while other neutral states may abandon military power altogether (examples of states doing this include Liechtenstein). However, the lack of a military does not always result in neutrality: Countries such as Costa Rica and Iceland replaced their standing army with a military guarantee from a stronger power or participation in a mutual defense pact (under TIAR and NATO respectively).

=== Leagues of armed neutrality ===
- The First League of Armed Neutrality was an alliance of minor naval powers organized in 1780 by Catherine II of Russia to prevent neutral shipping from being inspected by the Royal Navy during the American Revolutionary War. The establishment of the league was viewed by Americans as a mark of Russian friendship and sympathy. In the field of political science, this is the first historical example of armed neutrality, however, scholars like Carl Kulsrud argue that the concept of armed neutrality was introduced even earlier. Within 90 years before the First League of Armed Neutrality was established, neutral powers had joined forces no less than three times. As early as 1613, Lubeck and Holland joined powers to continue their maritime exploration without the commitment of being involved in wartime struggles on the sea.
- The Second League of Armed Neutrality was an effort to revive this during the French Revolutionary Wars. It consisted of Denmark–Norway, Prussia, Sweden and the Russian Empire. It existed between 1800 and 1801. The idea of the league was to prevent neutral shipping from being inspected by the Royal Navy. As the league made no mention of French interference with neutral shipping, the British viewed the league as pro-French and in 1801 attacked and defeated a Danish fleet in the Battle of Copenhagen. After the death of the Russian Tsar Paul I in the same year, the league collapsed.
- A potential Third League of Armed Neutrality was discussed during the American Civil War, but was never realized.

== Peacekeeping ==
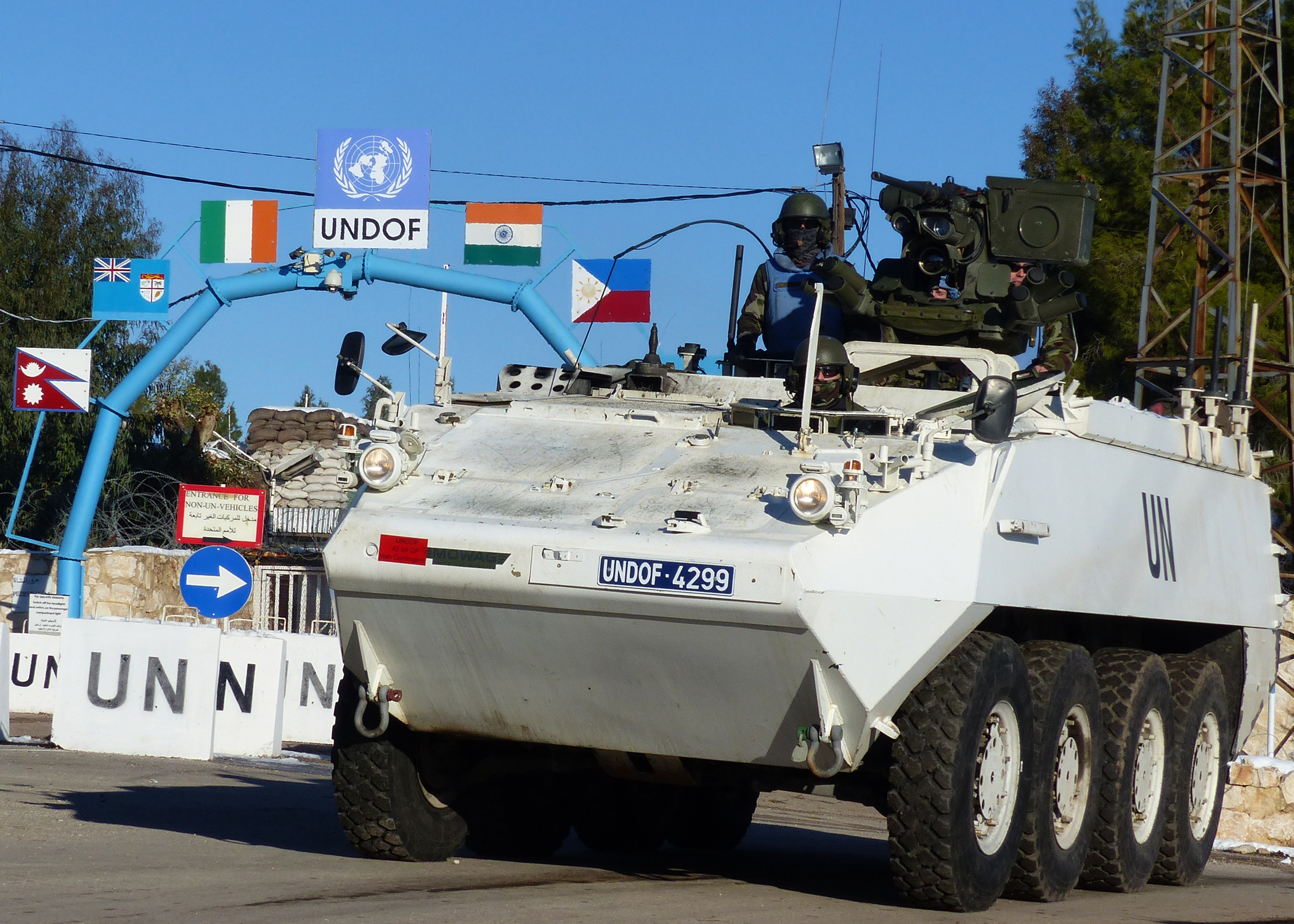
Irish units on UN patrol in the Golan Heights

For many states, such as Ireland, neutrality does not mean the absence of any foreign interventionism. Peacekeeping missions for the United Nations are seen as intertwined with it. The Swiss electorate rejected a 1994 proposal to join UN peacekeeping operations. Despite this, 23 Swiss observers and police have been deployed around the world in UN projects.

== Points of debate ==
The legitimacy of whether some states are as neutral as they claim has been questioned in some circles, although this depends largely on a state's interpretation of its form of neutrality.

=== European Union ===
Three members of the European Union currently describe themselves as neutral in some form, namely: Austria, Ireland, and Malta. Finland and Sweden were formerly also in this position but have explicitly renounced neutrality. The extent to which true neutrality is compatible with European Union constitutional law is debated within international relations.

Since the enactment of the Lisbon Treaty in 2007, EU members are bound by Article 42.7 Treaty on European Union (TEU), which obliges states to assist a fellow member that is the victim of armed aggression. It was invoked by France following the November 2015 Paris attacks without the need for a Council Decision. As relevant, Article 42.7 provides that:

"If a Member State is the victim of armed aggression on its territory, the other Member States shall have towards it an obligation of aid and assistance by all the means in their power, in accordance with Article 51 of the United Nations Charter. This shall not prejudice the specific character of the security and defence policy of certain Member States."

The EU's Common Security and Defence Policy (CSDP) was introduced through the Lisbon Treaty as part of the Common Foreign and Security Policy (CFSP). Denmark was the only member state to opt-out of the CSDP until terminated by a 2022 referendum following the Russian invasion of Ukraine. Austria, Ireland, and Malta are all party to the CSDP.

Separately, the so-called "solidarity clause" in Article 222 of the Treaty on the Functioning of the European Union (TFEU) which provides that "the Union and its Member States shall act jointly in a spirit of solidarity if a Member State is the object of a terrorist attack or the victim of a natural or man-made disaster" and makes explicit provision for the use of "military forces".

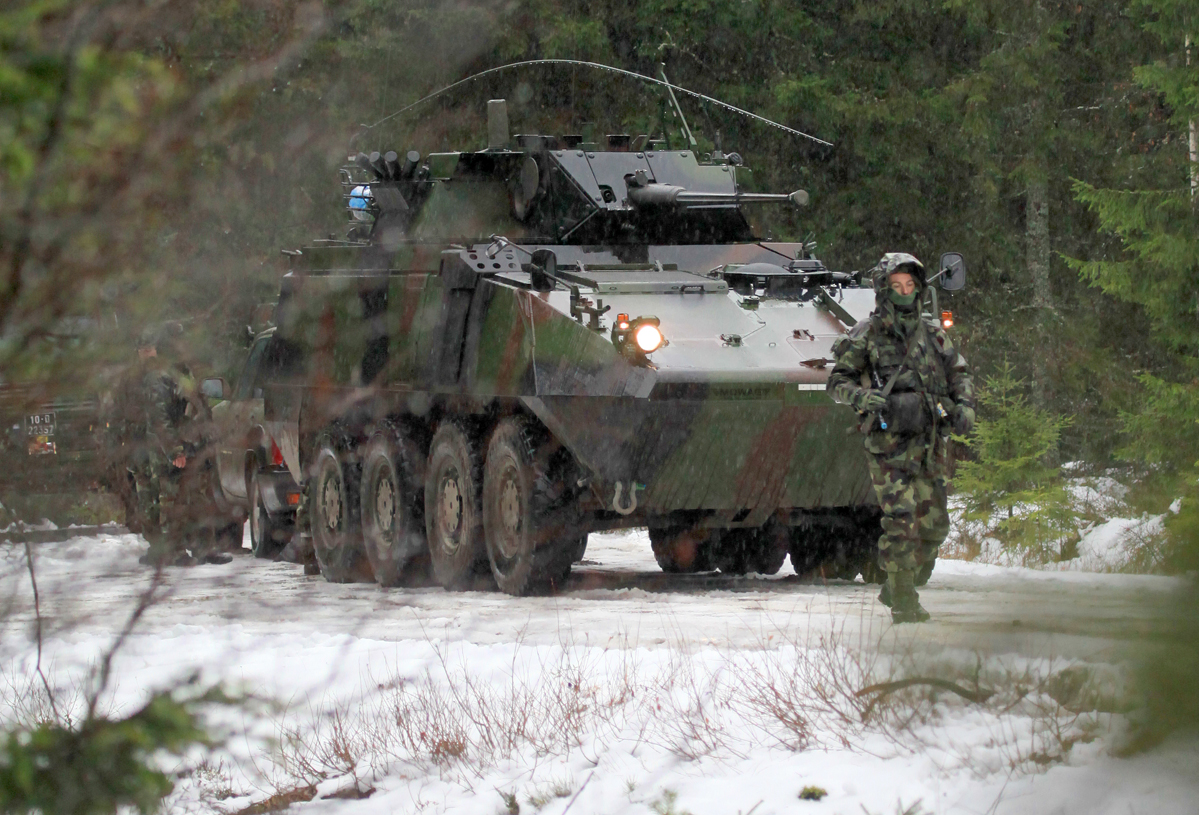
Irish armoured fighting vehicles participating in 2010 exercises with the Nordic Battlegroup as part of the EU's Common Security and Defence Policy.

Neutral states such as Ireland have sought guarantees for their historic neutrality within EU law. This includes a protocol in the Lisbon Treaty declaring that it "does not affect or prejudice Ireland’s traditional policy of military neutrality" since "it will be for Member States - including Ireland, acting in a spirit of solidarity and without prejudice to its traditional policy of military neutrality - to determine the nature of aid or assistance to be provided to a Member State which is the object of a terrorist attack or the victim of armed aggression on its territory."

The introduction of Permanent Structured Cooperation (PESCO) in defense in 2017 increased the EU's involvement in military affairs. PESCO was designed to be inclusive and allows states to opt in or out of specific forms of military cooperation. That has allowed most of the neutral states to participate, but opinions still vary. Some members of the Irish Parliament considered Ireland's joining PESCO as an abandonment of neutrality. It was passed with the government arguing that its opt-in nature allowed Ireland to "join elements of PESCO that were beneficial such as counter-terrorism, cybersecurity and peacekeeping... what we are not going to be doing is buying aircraft carriers and fighter jets". Malta is the only member-state not to participate in PESCO arguing that it would consider PESCO's future development to determine whether it might compromise Maltese neutrality.

=== Neutrality during World War II ===
"Neutrality is a negative word. It does not express what America ought to feel. We are not trying to keep out of trouble; we are trying to preserve the foundations on which peace may be rebuilt.”
— Woodrow Wilson

Many countries made neutrality declarations during World War II. However, of the European states closest to the war, only Andorra, Ireland, Portugal, Spain, Sweden, Switzerland (with Liechtenstein), and Vatican City (the Holy See) remained neutral to the end.

Their fulfillment to the letter of the rules of neutrality has been questioned: Ireland supplied important secret information to the Allies; for instance, the date of D-Day was decided on the basis of incoming Atlantic weather information, some of it supplied by Ireland but kept from Germany. Ireland also secretly allowed Allied aircraft to use the Donegal Corridor, making it possible for British planes to attack German U-boats in the mid-Atlantic. On the other hand, both Axis and Allied pilots who crash landed in Ireland were interned.

Sweden and Switzerland, surrounded by possessions and allies of Nazi Germany similarly made concessions to Nazi requests as well as to Allied requests. Sweden was also involved in intelligence operations with the Allies, including listening stations in Sweden and espionage in Germany. Spain offered to join the war on the side of Nazi Germany in 1940, allowed Axis ships and submarines to use its ports, imported war materials for Germany, and sent a Spanish volunteer combat division to aid the Nazi war effort. Portugal officially stayed neutral, but actively supported both the Allies by providing overseas naval bases, and Germany by selling tungsten.

The United States was initially neutral and bound by the Neutrality Acts of 1936 not to sell war materials to belligerents. Once war broke out, US President Franklin Delano Roosevelt persuaded Congress to replace the act with the Cash and carry program that allowed the US to provide military aid to the allies, despite opposition from non-interventionist members. The "Cash and carry" program was replaced in March 1941 by Lend-Lease, effectively ending the US pretense of neutrality.

Sweden also made concessions to the German Reich during the war to maintain its neutrality, the biggest concession was to let the 163rd German Infantry Division to be transferred from Norway to Finland by Swedish trains, to aid the Finns in the Continuation War. The decision caused a political "Midsummer Crisis" of 1941, about Sweden's neutrality.

Equally, Vatican City made various diplomatic concessions to the Axis and Allied powers alike, while still keeping to the rules of the Law of Neutrality. The Holy See has been criticized—but largely exonerated later—for its silence on moral issues of the war.

=== Imperialism and anti-imperialism ===
Neutrality and neutral countries have been an important but also challenging element in the history of imperialist power-play, as a space for the formation of internationalism and various anti-imperialisms.

== List of countries proclaiming to be neutral ==
Some countries may occasionally claim to be "neutral" but not comply with the internationally agreed upon definition of neutrality as listed above.

State	Period(s) of neutrality	Notes
Andorra	1914–present	Occupied by France during the Andorran Revolution.; Neutral during World War I and World War II. While serving as a smuggling route between Vichy France and Spain, Andorra made concessions to both sides to maintain its sovereignty.; A United Nations member since 1993.
Austria	1955–present	Main article: Declaration of Neutrality: Bound by the Federal Constitutional Law on the Neutrality of Austria in 1955 (demanded by the Soviet Union at the end of the Second World War and guaranteed by the Soviet Union, the United States, the United Kingdom and France).; The constitution prohibits military alliances and foreign military bases in Austria.; An EU Member since 1995: military non-aligned, see points of debate § European Union.
Bhutan	1910–present	Following the Duar War, the Treaty of Punakha saw the United Kingdom assume control of Bhutan's foreign policy in exchange for a guarantee to protect its independence. It was never incorporated into the British Raj, and adopted a primarily isolationist foreign policy. As such, Bhutan maintained neutrality during World War I and World War II, although King Jigme Wangchuck sent 100,000 rupees to the Raj as a gesture of goodwill.; After India became independent, the 1949 friendship treaty was signed, with India "guiding" Bhutan's foreign policy and guaranteeing protection from a hostile China, which laid claim to Bhutan as an extension of the now-occupied Tibet.; Is a member of the Non-Aligned Movement.
Cambodia	1993–present	Previously neutral from 1955 to 1970, when the Vietnam War spilled over its border and led to the rise of the Khmer Rouge, which resulted in the Cambodian genocide.; The constitution declares Cambodia to be an "independent, sovereign, peaceful, permanently neutral and non-aligned country."; Is a member of the Non-Aligned Movement.
Costa Rica	1949–present	Neutral since its military was dissolved in 1949.; Ratified by law in 2014.
Ghana	2012–present	Attempted neutrality during the Cold War, officially neutral since 2012.
Haiti	2017–present	Neutral since 2017.
Ireland	1939–present	Main article: Irish neutrality: Established a policy of neutrality during World War II, known as the Emergency in Ireland.; Despite this policy, Ireland made concessions to the Allied Powers by secretly sharing intelligence and weather reports as well as by repatriating downed Royal Air Force airmen.; It was believed that Ireland would take the German side if the United Kingdom attempted to invade Ireland, but would take the British side if invaded by Nazi Germany.; After the war, it was discovered that Germany had drawn up plans to invade Ireland in order to use the country for launching attacks into the United Kingdom, known as Operation Green.; Conversely, had Ireland been invaded, the United Kingdom had drawn up secret plans to intervene in Ireland with the collaboration of the Irish Government to push Germany back out, known as Plan W.; Ireland was invited to join NATO but did not wish to be in an alliance that included the United Kingdom.; Attached the condition of Irish reunification to membership.; Was clear that NATO would defend Ireland in the event of war, in part because Northern Ireland belonged to the United Kingdom.; An EU Member since 1973: military non-aligned, see points of debate § European Union.; Was granted a special acknowledgement in the Seville Declarations on the Treaty of Nice due to its views on the use of force in international politics.; Has provided military aid to Ukraine during the Russo-Ukrainian War.
Kazakhstan	2019–present	President Kassym-Jomart Tokayev proclaimed Kazakh "sovereignty and neutrality" in international affairs upon his assent to power, and has maintained it during the Russo-Ukrainian War.
Liechtenstein	1868–present	Military was dissolved in 1868.
Malta	1980–present	Policy of neutrality since 1980, guaranteed in a treaty with Italy, and added to constitution in 1987.; An EU Member since 2004: military non-aligned, see points of debate § European Union.
Mexico	1945–present	Main article: Estrada Doctrine See also: Mexico during World War II: Policy of neutrality since 1930, formulated by foreign secretary Genaro Estrada.; Broke neutrality by declaring war on the Axis Powers following the sinking of Mexican oil ships Potrero del Llano and Faja de Oro in May 1942. Mexico would later send an expeditionary force to fight in the Philippines.; Opened its borders in the 20th century to political refugees fleeing Francoist Spain and the military dictatorships of Central and South America.; During the presidency of Vicente Fox in the early 2000s, Mexico ignored the previous neutrality policy under foreign secretaries Jorge G. Castañeda and Luis Ernesto Derbez.; Whether historical neutrality is to be kept is now internally debated.
Moldova	1994–present	Main article: Moldovan neutrality: Article 11 of the 1994 Constitution proclaims "permanent neutrality".; In 2024 Moldova voted to amend its constitution to include the aim of becoming a European Union member state.; Moldova, alongside Turkmenistan, is one of the only two former Soviet republics to maintain the policy of neutrality.
Monaco	1945–present	Further information: Invasion and occupation of Monaco during World War II: Neutral during World War I; A United Nations member since 1993.
Mongolia	2015–present	Mongolia was neutral during World War I, but became a belligerent country in World War II.; In September 2015, Mongolian President Tsakhiagiin Elbegdorj announced at the United Nations General Assembly that Mongolia would implement a "policy of permanent neutrality," and called on the international community to recognise this policy.; Is a member of the Non-Aligned Movement.
Oman	1951–present	Since independence, the country has refused to join any current conflicts in the Middle East, or to be part of a Saudi-led regional block.; Is a member of the Non-Aligned Movement.
Panama	1990–present	The neutrality of the Panama Canal is enshrined by specific treaty.; Is a member of the Non-Aligned Movement.
Papua New Guinea	1975–present	The nation has pursued a policy of being "friends to all, enemies to none."; Is a member of the Non-Aligned Movement.
Rwanda	2009–present	After the 1994 genocide, Rwanda announced permanent neutrality in 2009 after joining the Commonwealth of Nations.; Is a member of the Non-Aligned Movement.
Samoa	1962–present	Neutrality established upon independence.; Defense treaties signed with New Zealand.
San Marino	1971–present	Neutral during the Napoleonic Wars, the Italian Wars of Independence, and World War I.; Declared neutrality in 1939 at the start of World War II, but was violated first by an RAF bombing campaign and later a German invasion. The Germans and Allies clashed the Battle of San Marino, and Allied troops occupied the country for two months before leaving.; A 1971 amendment to its convention with Italy officially recognized San Marino's neutrality as a founding principle, with the government describing its foreign policy as "active neutrality", in staying out of military alliances while participating in international diplomacy.; A United Nations member since 1992.
Serbia	2007–present	The National Assembly declared military neutrality of the country in 2007.; Serbia is the only state in Southeastern Europe that is not seeking NATO membership, having been the target of the 1999 NATO bombing, but also due to the ensuing secession of and territorial dispute with Kosovo, as well as a close relationship with Russia.
Switzerland	1815–present	Main articles: Swiss neutrality and Switzerland during the World Wars Further information: Aerial incidents in Switzerland in World War II and Operation Tannenbaum: Self-imposed, permanent, and armed, designed to ensure external security. Because of that, it is the most globally known example of a neutral country.; The 1815 Congress of Vienna re-established Switzerland and its permanent neutrality was guaranteed by France, Prussia, Russia, the United Kingdom and others.; Swiss neutrality was so rigorously defended that the country refused even to join the United Nations until 2002.; However, the Swiss Armed Forces participated in the U.S.-led War in Afghanistan; in what the Swiss Broadcasting Corporation described as the nation's "first military deployment since 1815." During the 2003 invasion of Iraq, the United States was given permission to use Swiss airspace for surveillance missions over Iraq.; Switzerland adopted sanctions imposed by the EU against Russia in 2022 in response to Russia's invasion of Ukraine. Switzerland has previously only put in place sanctions created by the United Nations Security Council.; Switzerland has no law that allows it to impose sanctions by itself, it can only adopt sanctions from the UN Security Council, the OECD or the EU.
Tonga	2014–present	Declared neutrality in 1845 following unification by George Tupou I. Tonga retained its sovereignty when it became a protectorate of the United Kingdom in 1900.; Sālote Tupou III broke neutrality and declared war on the Axis in 1939 and 1941, respectively, aligning her country with the Allies. Tonga troops fought in Guadalcanal and the larger Solomon Islands campaign.; Sent troops to Iraq from 2003 to 2008, and Afghanistan from 2011 to 2014.; Neutrality was reaffirmed in 2025.
Turkmenistan	1995–present	Declared its complete neutrality and had it formally recognized by the United Nations on 12 December 1995. This date is designated as a national holiday in Turkmenistan.; Is a member of the Non-Aligned Movement.; Turkmenistan, alongside Moldova and neighboring Uzbekistan, is one of only three former Soviet republics to maintain the policy of neutrality.; Is a member of the Non-Aligned Movement.
Uzbekistan	2012–present	In 2012, the law of the Republic of Uzbekistan "On approval of the Concept of foreign policy of the Republic of Uzbekistan" was adopted.; Is a member of the Non-Aligned Movement.
Vatican City	1929–present	Main article: Vatican City during World War II: The Lateran Treaty signed in 1929 with Italy imposed that "The Pope was pledged to perpetual neutrality in international relations and to abstention from mediation in a controversy unless specifically requested by all parties" thus making Vatican City neutral since then.; Is an observer of the Non-Aligned Movement.

== List of formerly neutral countries ==
State	Period(s) of neutrality	Notes
(Kingdom of Afghanistan) Afghanistan	1914–1918 (neutral during World War I); 1939–1945 (neutral during World War II)	Is a member of the Non-Aligned Movement
Albania	1914–1918 (neutral during World War I); 1968 (attempted neutrality during the Prague Spring)	A NATO member since 2009.
Argentina	1914–1918 (neutral during World War I); 1939–1945 (attempted neutrality during World War II)	Main article: Argentina during World War II: Declared neutrality at the start of the Second World War, even though the government of Argentina was sympathetic to the Allies. Following the Japanese attack on Pearl Harbor and the subsequent U.S. entry into the war, pressure for Argentine entry into the war begun to increase. Relations worsened further following a military coup in 1943, as the U.S. accused the plotters of having Axis sympathies. Because of strong divisions and internal disputes between members of the Argentine military, the country would continue to remain neutral, even after massive U.S. sanctions and threats of invasion. However, Argentina eventually gave in to the Allies' pressure and declared war on March 27, 1945. Over 4,000 Argentine volunteers fought on the Allied side.; A Rio Pact member since 1948.; A Major non-NATO ally since 1998.
Belgium	1839–1914 (to World War I); 1936–1940 (to World War II)	Neutral stance from Treaty of London until the Treaty of Versailles, after the German invasion and occupation of Belgium.; Proclaimed neutrality in October 1936 and severed 1920 accord with France.; Neutrality abolished again after World War II following the Battle of Belgium.; A NATO member since 1949.; Is a member of the European Union.
Brazil	1870–1917 (to World War I); 1939–1942 (to World War II)	Main articles: Brazil during World War I and Brazil in World War II: Neutral from the end of the Paraguayan War and continued through the fall of its empire and beginning of republican government.; Became the only country in Latin America to be directly involved in World War I, with its only major contribution being the Navy's patrol of areas in the Atlantic Ocean.; Declared neutrality at the beginning of World War II, but declared war on the Axis following the sinking of Brazilian ships. Later, it became the only South American country to send its own troops to the European theater.; Is a Major non-NATO ally.
Bulgaria	1939–1941 (to World War II)	Main article: Bulgaria during World War II: The Kingdom of Bulgaria under Tsar Boris III and Prime Minister Georgi Kyoseivanov officially declared a position of strict neutrality, hoping to stay out of the war while pursuing peaceful territorial recovery.; Neutrality ended on March 1, 1941, when it signed the Tripartite Pact and joined the Axis powers. Despite this, Bulgaria remained neutral in the German-Soviet war, refused to send troops to the Eastern Front, and kept diplomatic relations with the Soviet Union until 1944. As Soviet forces approached its borders, the Bulgarian government tried to break away in August and re-proclaim neutrality, but the Soviet Union rejected the plea and declared war on September 2; following a Soviet-backed communist coup on September 9, Bulgaria abandoned its alignment and declared war on Nazi Germany, later deposing the infant Tsar Simeon II in 1946.; A NATO member since 2004.; Is a member of the European Union.
Chile	1885–1943 (after Saltpeter War to World War II)	Main article: Chile during the Second World War See also: List of wars involving Chile and Operation Condor: Although neutral during World War I, Chile severed diplomatic relations with the Axis powers on 1943, fought an espionage campaign against local Axis agents, and eventually declared war on Japan in April 1945.; A Rio Pact member since 1948, Chile under Augusto Pinochet was closely aligned with the West against the Soviet Union during the last decades of the Cold War, and provided aid to the United Kingdom during the Falklands War due to a long-standing dispute with Argentina over territory in Tierra del Fuego.; Is a member of the Non-Aligned Movement.
China	1914–1917 (to World War I)	Main article: China during World War I: Retained a "Middle Kingdom" mindset for most of the Qing's rule, as a form of isolation, until the Boxer Rebellion.; When World War I began in 1914, President Yuan Shikai declared China's neutrality, as the country was militarily weak and politically chaotic, with Yuan having to contend with multiple warlords. While neutral, China sought to regain foreign-controlled territories, particularly German holdings in Tsingtao. Following Yuan's death, and the German sinking of the French ship SS Athos, which killed over 500 Chinese, Premier Duan Qirui led the effort to bring China into the war on the side of the Entente, ostensibly to gain foreign backing for China's republican government.
Colombia	1914–1918 (neutral during World War I); 1933–1943 (to World War II)	Main article: Colombia during World War II See also: List of wars involving Colombia: Ended in 1943 when Colombia declared war on the Axis powers.; A Rio Pact member since 1948.; Sent a battalion to serve in Korea.; Is a member of the Non-Aligned Movement and a Major non-NATO ally.
Cracow	1815–1846 (to annexation)	Conquered by Austria in 1846.; Given to a reconstituted Poland in 1918.; A NATO member since 1999 as a part of Poland.
Denmark	1864–1940 (after Second Schleswig War to World War II)	Neutrality ended during World War II when Nazi Germany invaded Denmark in 1940.; A NATO member since 1949.; A European Union member since 1973.
El Salvador	1906–1941 (to World War II)	See also: Military dictatorship in El Salvador: Ended in 1941 when El Salvador declared war on the Axis powers under pressure from the United States.; Participated in the Multi-National Force – Iraq from 2003 until 2009.
Estonia	1938–1939 (to World War II)	Declared its neutrality 1938, but was thereafter forced to allow troops of the Soviet Union to enter in 1939 and was occupied by it 1940 in accordance with the Molotov–Ribbentrop Pact.; A NATO and EU member since 2004.
Ethiopia	1914–1918 (neutral during World War I)	Is a member of the Non-Aligned Movement.
Finland	1935–1939 (to Winter War); 1956–2022 (from return of Porkkala lease area to Russian invasion of Ukraine)	Main articles: Foreign relations of Finland and Finland-Russia relations § Finnish NATO membership question: Treaty of Tartu (Finland–Russia) was signed in 1920 and expired in 1939. The treaty confirmed the border between Finland and Soviet Russia after the Finnish Civil War and Finnish volunteer expeditions in Russian East Karelia. The treaty was signed in Tartu, Estonia.; Finlandization; Neutrality was violated after the Winter War broke out on 1939.; Moscow Peace Treaty was signed in 1940, which ended the Winter War. The Interim Peace was in effect from 13 March 1940 to 24 June 1941.; Moscow Armistice was signed on 19 September 1944, ending the Continuation War. The final peace treaty between Finland and many of the Allies was signed in Paris in 1947.; The YYA Treaty (Agreement of Friendship, Cooperation, and Mutual Assistance) was signed in 1948: the Soviets sought to deter Western or Allied Powers from attacking the Soviet Union through Finnish territory, and the Finns sought to increase Finland's political independence from the Soviet Union. The treaty came to an end in 1992.; An EU Member since 1995: military non-aligned, see points of debate § European Union.; Has provided military aid to Ukraine during the Russo-Ukrainian War.; Abandoned neutrality in favor of becoming a NATO applicant in 2022.; A NATO member since 2023.
Greece	1914–1917 (to World War I); 1939–1940 (to Greco-Italian War)	Neutral in most conficts from Treaty of Constantinople with independence recognized by the Great Powers (Britain, France and Russia), apart from intervention in the Crimean War and frequent clashes with the Ottoman Empire culminating in the First Balkan War.; Declared neutrality in 1914 at the start of the First World War under King Constantine I, though opposed by the pro-Entente Prime Minister Eleftherios Venizelos. In 1917, following an ultimatum, the king abdicated and Venizelos declared war.; Neutrality declared in 1939 with the start of the Second World War which lasted until the Greco-Italian War followed by an invasion and conquest by Nazi Germany.; A NATO member since 1952.; Is a member of the European Union.
Greenland	1940–1941 (from Fall of Denmark to World War II)	Main article: Greenland in World War II: Greenland exercised its sovereignty after the fall of Denmark in 1940, and declared its neutrality. The United States became a protecting power over the island to ward off Axis invasion, and Greenland later joined the war alongside the U.S. in 1941.; A NATO member since 1949 as a part of Denmark.
Hawaii	1854–1898 (to annexation)	Main article: Hawaiian rebellions (1887–1895): The Kingdom of Hawaii remained neutral for much of its existence, including during the Crimean War and the U.S. Civil War.; Monarchy overthrown in a U.S.-backed coup d'état, replaced by a republican government and later an American territorial government.; A U.S. state since 1959.
Hungary	1956 (attempted neutrality during the Hungarian Revolution)	A NATO member since 1999.; A European Union member since 2004.
Hyderabad	1947–1948 (to annexation)	Mir Osman Ali Khan declared an independent monarchy during the final years of the British Raj. However, the region was beset by the communist Telangana rebellion, which the Nizam's irregular army was unable to defeat.; After the Partition of India, Hyderabad signed a standstill agreement with the new Dominion of India, continuing all previous arrangements except for the stationing of Indian troops in the state. Hyderabad's location in the middle of the Indian Union, as well as its diverse cultural heritage (A Muslim monarch ruling over an overwhelmingly Hindu population) led to India launching an invasion of the state in 1948.
Iceland	1918–1940 (to World War II)	Main article: Iceland in World War II: The Kingdom of Iceland declared its neutrality in 1940 after the fall of Denmark, but was thereafter invaded and occupied by British troops. The government later requested the United States assume the role of its defense for the duration of the war.; A NATO member since 1949.
Iran	1914–1918 (neutral during World War I); 1939–1943 (neutral during World War II)	Main article: Anglo-Soviet invasion of Iran: Occupied by the Allies in 1941, subsequently declared war on the Axis in 1943.; Is a member of the Non-Aligned Movement.
Iroquoia	1812–1917 (to World War I)	Main article: Native Americans and World War II: Following divisions in the American Revolutionary War, the confederation declared its neutrality in the 1812 war between Britain and the United States, although warriors from different tribes fought on both sides.; The confederation declared war on the German Empire in 1917, but never made peace following the end of the First World War. They subsequently issued a second war declaration on the Axis powers in 1942 following the attack on Pearl Harbor and the United States joining the war.
Israel	1949–1955 (to Black Arrow)	Following its war of independence, Israel sought to forge a neutral path and peaceful relations with both the West and the USSR. This was primarily to balance receiving monetary assistance from Jewish supporters living in the US, and maintain access to Soviet weaponry via Czechoslovakia.; Prime Minister David Ben-Gurion sought to build good relations with the USSR during his time in power.; Neutrality ostensibly ended with the beginning of a weapons alliance with France in the mid-1950s and covert support for French forces in Algeria.; Provided military aid to Argentina during the Falklands War.; A Major non-NATO ally since 1987.
Italy	1914–1915 (to World War I)	Declared neutrality at the beginning of World War I despite being in a (defensive) alliance with Germany and Austria-Hungary.; Later renounced neutrality and joined the Allied Powers in exchange for territorial cessions through the secret Treaty of London.; A NATO member since 1949.; EU member since 1957.
Laos	1955–1975 (ostensibly neutral throughout the Vietnam War)	The International Agreement on the Neutrality of Laos was signed in Geneva on 23 July 1962, by 14 nations, including the five permanent members of the United Nations Security Council. However throughout the Laotian Civil War, Laos was fighting the PAVN and Pathet Lao with the help of the United States among other anti-communist countries. Laos's neutrality can therefore be described as a "false neutrality".; Is a member of the Non-Aligned Movement.
Latvia	1938–1939 (to World War II)	Declared its neutrality 1938, but was thereafter forced to allow troops of the Soviet Union to enter in 1939 and was occupied by it 1940 in accordance with the Molotov–Ribbentrop Pact.; A NATO and EU member since 2004.
Liberia	1914–1917 (to World War I); 1939–1944 (to World War II)	Main articles: Liberia in World War I and Liberia in World War II: Liberia declared its neutrality in 1914, later joining after pressure from the United States in 1917.; Declared its neutrality again in 1939 at the start of the Second World War, but granted Allied forces early access to its territory. Liberia served as one of the Allies' only sources of rubber during the war when the plantations of Southeast Asia had been taken over by the Japanese.
Lithuania	1939 (to World War II)	Declared its neutrality 1939, but was thereafter forced to allow troops of the Soviet Union to enter in 1939 and was occupied by it 1940 in accordance with the Molotov–Ribbentrop Pact.; A NATO and EU member since 2004.
Luxembourg	1839–1914 (to World War I); 1920–1940 (to World War II)	Neutral stance since 1839, abolished through its constitution in 1948.; Neutrality was violated twice in both World Wars due to German invasions and occupations. During World War I, it was occupied by Germany but allowed Luxembourg to retain its government and political institutions. However, during World War II, it was treated as part of Nazi Germany proper and was fully annexed into the German Reich in 1942, incorporating it entirely into Gau Moselland.; A NATO member since 1949.; An EU member since 1957.
Nepal	1858–1914 (to World War I); 1918–1939 (to World War II)	See also: Nepal in World War II: Aided the British during the Sepoy Rebellion.; Sent troops to serve in the Tajikistani and Somali civil wars under UN supervision.; Is a member of the Non-Aligned Movement.
Netherlands Netherlands	1648–1652 (to First Anglo-Dutch War); 1839–1940 (to World War II)	True neutrality was rare during the age of the Dutch Republic.; Self-imposed neutrality between 1839 and 1940 on the European continent.; Ended after the Battle of the Netherlands.; A NATO member since 1949.; An EU member since 1957.
Norway	1814–1940 (to World War II)	See also: The Neutral Ally: Abolished after Norway was invaded by Nazi Germany during World War II in 1940.; A NATO member since 1949.
Oklahoma	1834–1861 (to U.S. Civil War); 1866–1906 (to annexation)	The Five Tribes which governed Oklahoma remained neutral towards external affairs following the Trail of Tears. Upon the outbreak of hostilities, certain leaders such as Laughing Fox, Snapping Turtle and John Ross all advocated maintaining neutrality as the consensus of the tribes, but neither the Union nor the Confederacy would permit such, each demanding the tribes choose a side. Following the war, the U.S. government required the Five Tribes to abolish slavery in exchange for a renewed recognition of their independence, which was granted in 1866.; Despite the isolationist desires of the Five Nations, the United States held suzerainty power and significantly reduced Oklahoma's independence in the following decades. A series of mass-demographic shifts, aided by the expansion of railroads later led to the establishment of a U.S.-backed territorial government.; A U.S. state since 1907.
Orange Free State	1854–1899 (to Second Boer War)	See also: Boer Republics: Conquered by Britain in 1900.; Annexed into South Africa in 1902.
Portugal	1932–1945 (neutral during World War II)	Main article: Portugal during World War II: While neutral throughout World War II, Portugal became non-belligerent towards the Allies, as evidenced in the Azores Base.; A NATO member since 1949.; EU member since 1986.
Romania	1914–1916 (to World War I); 1939–1940 (to World War II)	Main articles: Romania in World War I and Romania in World War II: Declared neutrality at the beginning of the First World War, before siding with the Entente with the intent to gain Transylvania from Austria-Hungary.; Declared neutrality again in 1939 and sheltered the fleeing Polish government after the German invasion. However, pressure from neighboring powers and massive territorial losses in 1940 (to the Soviet Union, Hungary, and Bulgaria) collapsed this neutrality and led to the rise of radical movements. Seeking protection and the recovery of lost lands, Romania joined the Axis Powers and contributed hundreds of thousands of troops to the German invasion of the Soviet Union.; In August 1944, as Soviet forces advanced and the German war effort faltered, King Michael I led a coup that arrested the pro-Nazi prime minister, Ion Antonescu, and joined the Allies.; A NATO member since 2004.; Is a member of the European Union.
Saudi Arabia	1939–1945 (to World War II)	Although officially neutral, the Saudis severed diplomatic contacts with Germany on 11 September 1939, and with Japan in October 1941, and later provided the Allies with large supplies of oil. Diplomatic relations with the United States were established in 1943, and King Ibn Saud became a personal friend of Franklin D. Roosevelt. During the war, the Americans were allowed to build an air force base near Dhahran.; Later declared war on Germany on 28 February 1945 and Japan on 1 April 1945, but no military actions resulted from the declaration.
Soviet Union	1939–1941 (to World War II)	Main article: Molotov–Ribbentrop Pact: Signed a non-aggression pact with Nazi Germany in 1939. The USSR remained neutral in the war between Germany and the Allied powers, while actively supporting Germany with resources and annexing territory in Eastern Europe, with the joint German-Soviet invasion of Poland and the Baltics.; Neutrality violated by Nazi invasion in 1941, wherein the Soviet Union became a co-combatant of the Allies.
Spain	1914–1918 (neutral during World War I); 1940–1945 (neutral during World War II)	Main articles: Spain during World War I and Spain during World War II Further information: Meeting at Hendaye, Operation Felix, and Wolfram Crisis: While neutral throughout World War I and World War II, Spain did lean towards the Axis, as evidenced by the Blue Division; however, these troops were only allowed to fight the Soviet Union, not the Western Allies.; The UK and the US used economic inducements to Caudillo Francisco Franco to keep Spain neutral throughout the war, and he was later praised for his secret assistance to the Allies by Winston Churchill, Charles de Gaulle and Franklin D. Roosevelt.; Franco's regime, despite its opposition to Zionism, did not share the rabid anti-Semitic ideology promoted by the Nazis, and Spain effectively undertook more to help Jews escape deportation to the concentration camps than most neutral countries did.; Signed a military pact with the United States in 1953.; A NATO member since 1982.; EU member since 1986.
Sweden	1814–2022	Main articles: Swedish neutrality and Sweden during World War II: First nation in the world to declare neutrality in 1814.; Formally proclaimed by King Charles XIV John in 1834.; Sweden has not been part of a war since 1814. This makes Sweden the nation which has had the longest period of peace.; Has adapted policy to protect its interests. During the Finnish Civil War, Sweden intervened on Åland. In World War II it allowed the Nazi Wehrmacht passage through its territory to Finland for the invasion of the Soviet Union, while also protecting refugees from the Nazis.; An EU Member since 1995: military non-aligned, see points of debate § European Union.; Has nevertheless deployed combat troops to military conflicts overseas under United Nations command as part of ONUC during the Congo Crisis (1961–1964), and as part of UNPROFOR during the Bosnian War (1992–1995). Swedish military forces also participated in the War in Afghanistan, the 2011 military intervention in Libya and the Mali War.; Has provided military aid to Ukraine during the Russo-Ukrainian War.; Abandoned neutrality in favor of becoming a NATO applicant in 2022.; A NATO member since 2024.
Texas	1836–1846 (to annexation); 1861 (attempted neutrality during the U.S. Civil War)	Main article: Texas in the American Civil War: Recognized by the U.S. and European powers, Texas remained neutral in international disputes during its short existence.; Attempted neutrality under Sam Houston during the Civil War, but Houston was removed from office by the pro-Confederate government legislature and replaced with a pro-Confederate governor.; Restored as a U.S. state in 1870.
Thailand	1940–1941 (to World War II)	Main article: Thailand in World War II: Following the end of the Franco-Thai War, Thailand officially adopted a neutral position during World War II.; Neutrality lasted until the Japanese invasion of Thailand on 8 December 1941, which led to an armistice and military alliance treaty with the Empire of Japan in mid-December 1941.; Following liberation by Allied forces, Thailand would remain in the camp of the anti-communist Western military bloc, sending troops to fight in the Korean and Vietnam wars.
Tibet	1939–1945 (neutral during World War II)	Main article: Tibet (1912–1951): While de facto independent under the rule of the Dalai Lama, Tibet was internationally recognized as a province of China. Regardless, British and American military officers journeyed to Lhasa in 1943 and met with the Tibetan government, treating it effectively as an independent polity.; Invaded and annexed by Communist China in 1951.
Transvaal	1881–1899 (from First Boer War to Second Boer War)	See also: Boer Republics: Conquered by Britain in 1900.; Annexed into South Africa in 1902.
Turkey	1940–1945 (to World War II)	Main article: German–Turkish Treaty of Friendship: Signed a non-aggression pact with Nazi Germany in 1941. Despite the pact stipulating that it was to last for ten years, Turkey severed its diplomatic and commercial relations with Germany in 1944, and on 1945 Turkey finally declared war on Nazi Germany, ending its neutrality.; A NATO member since 1952.
Tuva	1921–1941 (to World War II)	Main article: Tuva in World War II: Despite the de jure political independence of the Tuvan People's Republic in 1921, the country was largely dependent on the Russian SFSR. This was evidenced in the Soviet-backed 1929 coup d'état, which saw the ousting of the nationalist Prime Minister Donduk Kuular and his replacement by communist Salchak Toka.; Declared war on Germany shortly after Operation Barbarossa in 1941.; Joined the Soviet Union in 1944.; Republic of the Russian Federation since 1992.
Ukraine	1991–2014 (to Russo-Ukrainian War)	In its Declaration of Sovereignty (1990), Ukraine declared it had the "intention of becoming a permanently neutral state that does not participate in military blocs and adheres to three nuclear free principles" (art. 9). The 1996 Ukrainian Constitution, based upon the Declaration of Independence of 24 August 1991, contained the basic principles of non-coalition and future neutrality. Such policy of state non-alignment was re-confirmed by law in 2010.; However, the Ukrainian army participated in the U.S.-led Iraq War. Ukraine provided the third-largest number of forces in Iraq.; After the annexation of Crimea by Russia and subsequent war in Donbas, Ukraine's parliament voted to drop non-aligned status on 23 December 2014.; In 2017 Ukraine enshrined the desire to join NATO in its constitution.
United States	1914–1917 (to World War I); 1939–1941 (to World War II)	Main article: United States non-interventionism: Pursuant to the non-interventionist policy set forth by George Washington, the U.S. declared its neutrality at the beginning of both world wars.; However, it declared war on Germany during World War I in 1917 following the series of German U-boat attacks on American merchant ships supplying war material to the Allies in the Atlantic Ocean and declared war on Japan in World War II in 1941 following the Japanese surprise attack on Pearl Harbor, Honolulu, Hawaii.; A NATO member since 1949.
Uruguay	1870–1945 (after Paraguayan War to World War II)	Main article: Uruguay during World War II: A long time neutrality ended in February 1945 when Uruguay declared war on the Axis Powers.; A Rio Pact member since 2020.; Although not officially neutral, the U.S. State Department previously described the country as "usually considered a neutral country and blessed with a professional diplomatic corps... often called on to preside over international bodies."
Venezuela	1914–1918 (neutral during World War I); 1939–1942 (to World War II)	Main article: Venezuela during World War II: Neutrality was violated in 1942 when the Attack on Aruba occurred. Although Venezuela was officially neutral for most of the war, it covertly supported the Allies in the Caribbean, and eventually declared war on the Axis powers in February 1945, a few months before the end of the conflict.
Venice	1718–1797 (to French Revolutionary Wars)	Main article: Fall of the Republic of Venice: Conquered by France in 1797.; Annexed into Italy in 1866.; A NATO member since 1949 as a part of Italy.
Yemen	1939–1945 (neutral during World War II)	The Mutawakkilite king Imam Yahya held pro-Axis sympathies and had previously formed an alliance with Italy in 1936. However, he maintained an isolationist foreign policy for the duration of the war.
Yugoslavia Yugoslavia	1940–1941 (to World War II); 1949–1992 (to Yugoslav Wars)	Main article: World War II in Yugoslavia: Although founding member of the Little Entente committed to it until its dissolution in 1938, after much German pressure the Kingdom of Yugoslavia was forced to declare its neutrality between the Axis and Western powers. However, following an anti-Axis coup, Yugoslavia was invaded and subsequently carved up by the Axis.; Ever since the Stalin-Tito split in 1949, the SFR Yugoslavia became a buffer zone between the Soviet bloc and the West. Insisting in its neutrality in the Cold War, Yugoslavia became a founder and a leading force of the Non-Aligned Movement.; While maintaining its neutrality, Yugoslavia did diplomatically support South Korea and the anti-communist alliance in the Korean War, accusing the Soviet Union of starting the conflict.

== See also ==
- Buffer state
- Dual loyalty
- European Union–NATO relations
- International humanitarian law
- Neutral powers during World War II
- Non-belligerent
- Non-interventionism
- Policy of deliberate ambiguity
- Strategic autonomy
- Third World
- Neutral and Non-Aligned European States
- Neutralized Zone of Savoy

== Bibliography ==
- Bemis, Samuel. "The United States and the Abortive Armed Neutrality of 1794. In "The American Historical Review, Vol. 24, No. 1 (October 1918), pp. 26–47
- Bienstock, Gregory. The Struggle for the Pacific. Alcester, Warwickshire, U.K.: Read Books, 2007. ISBN 1-4067-7218-6
- Bissell, Richard E. and Gasteyger, Curt Walter. The Missing link: West European Neutrals and Regional Security. Durham, N.C.: Duke University Press, 1990. ISBN 0-8223-0953-X
- Corse, Edward and García Cabrera, Marta (eds), Propaganda and Neutrality: global case studies in the twentieth century. London and New York. Bloomsbury, 2023. ISBN 978-1-3503-2553-1. Open Access https://www.bloomsburycollections.com/monograph?docid=b-9781350325562 Fenwick, Charles. "The Status of Armed Neutrality." The American Political Science Review, Vol. 11, No. 2 (May 1917), pp. 388–389
- Hayes, Carlton. "Armed Neutrality with a Purpose." In "The Advocate of Peace." Vol. 79, No. 3 (March 1917), pp. 74–77
- Jones, Howard. Crucible of Power: A History of American Foreign Relations to 1913. 2d ed. New York: Rowman & Littlefield, 2009. ISBN 0-7425-6534-3
- Karsh, Efraim. Neutrality and Small States. Florence, Ky.: Routledge, 1988. ISBN 0-415-00507-8
- Kulsrud, Carl J. "Armed Neutrality to 1870." The American Journal of International Law. Vol. 29, No. 3 (July 1935), pp. 423–447 JSTOR i311972
- Lottaz, Pascal/Reginbogin, Herbert R. (eds.) Notions of Neutralities. Lanham (MD): Lexington Books, 2019. ISBN 978-1498582261
- Marabello, Thomas Quinn (2023). "Challenges to Swiss Democracy: Neutrality, Napoleon, & Nationalism," Swiss American Historical Society Review, Vol. 59: No. 2. Available at: https://scholarsarchive.byu.edu/sahs_review/vol59/iss2/5
- Murdoch, James C. and Sandler, Todd. "Swedish Military Expenditures and Armed Neutrality." In The Economics of Defence Spending: An International Survey. Keith Hartley and Todd Sandler, eds. Florence, Ky.: Routledge, 1990. ISBN 0-415-00161-7
- O'Sullivan, Michael Joseph. Ireland and the Global Question. Syracuse, N.Y.: Syracuse University Press, 2006. ISBN 0-8156-3106-5
- Oppenheim, Lassa. International Law: War and Neutrality. London: Longmans, Green, 1906.
- Petropoulos, Jonathan, "Co-Opting Nazi Germany: Neutrality in Europe During World War II." Dimensions 14.1 (2000): 13+. excerpt
- Scott, James Brown. The Armed Neutralities of 1780 and 1800: A Collection of Official Documents Preceded by the Views of Representative Publicists. New York: Oxford University Press, 1918.
- Wills, Clair. That Neutral Island: A Cultural History of Ireland During the Second World War. Cambridge, Mass.: Harvard University Press, 2007. ISBN 0-674-02682-9
- "Woodrow Wilson asks U.S. Congress for declaration of war". The History Channel website. 2014. Event occurs at 10:51..
