= Latin America during World War II =

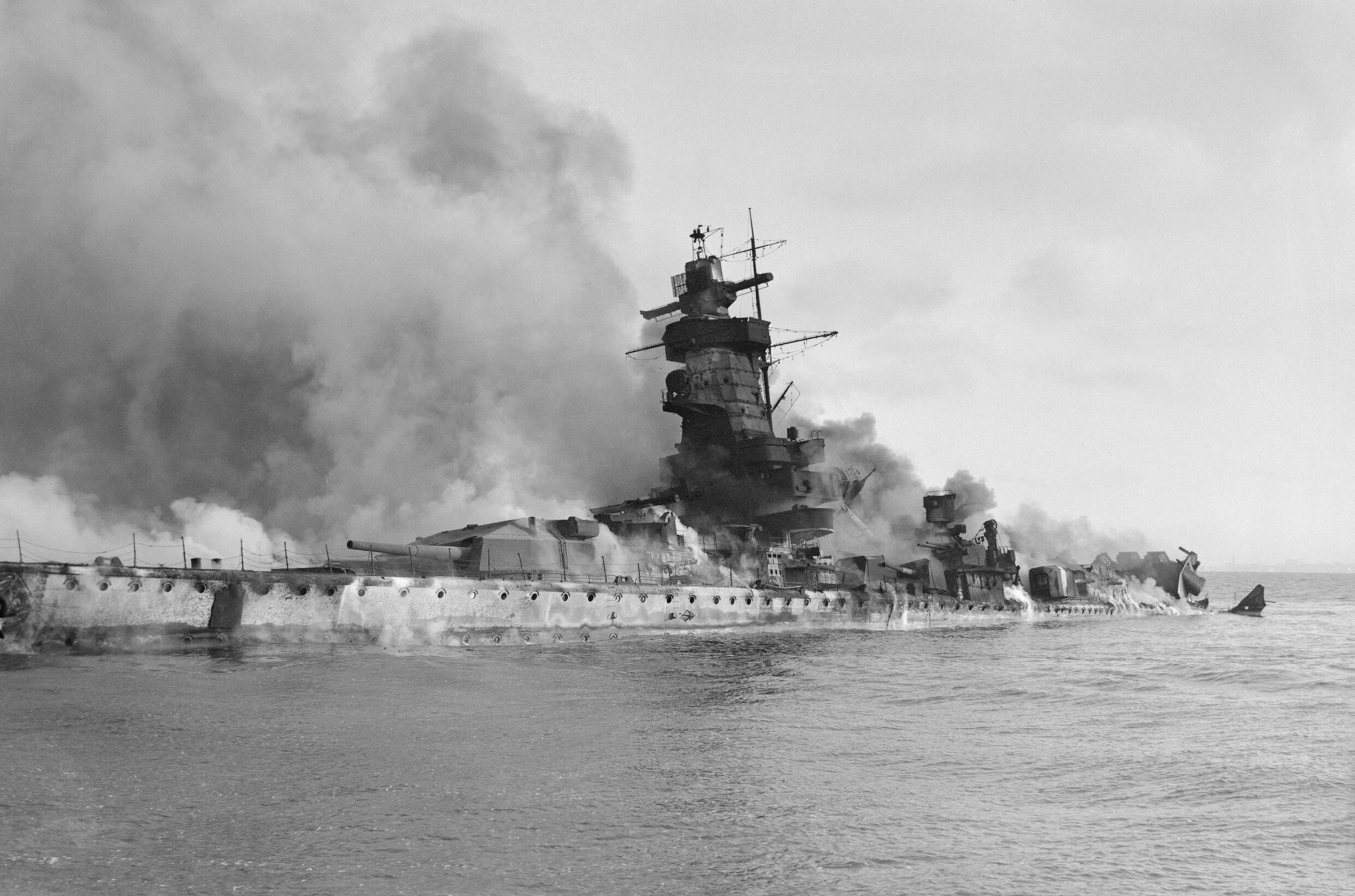
- Following the Battle of the River Plate, the German Deutschland-class cruiser Admiral Graf Spee was scuttled by her crew off Montevideo, Uruguay, on December 17, 1939.
- Location: Latin America
- Date: 1939–1945
- Events: The St. Louis Affair – June 1939; Battle of the River Plate – December 13, 1939; Operation Bolivar begins – May 1940; Sinking of Toltén – March 13, 1942; The Lüning Affair – August 1942; The sinking of U-176 – May 15, 1943; Revolution of '43 – June 4, 1943; The Strike of Fallen Arms – May 5–11, 1944; The Panama Canal strike – June 1945

Mexican propaganda poster: "We defend Liberty and fight for a better world," with portraits of Miguel Hidalgo y Costilla, Benito Juárez, Francisco I. Madero and Manuel Ávila Camacho.

During World War II, a number of significant economic, political, and military changes took place in Latin America. The war caused considerable panic in the region as large portions of their economies depended on trade with the European market, which was completely disrupted due to the war. Latin America tried to stay neutral at first but the warring countries were endangering their neutrality. In order to better protect the Panama Canal, combat Axis influence, and optimize the production of goods for the war effort, the United States through Lend-Lease and similar programs greatly expanded its interests in Latin America, resulting in large-scale modernization and a major economic boost for the countries that participated.

Strategically, Panama was the most important Latin American nation for the Allies because of the Panama Canal, which provided a link between the Atlantic and Pacific Oceans that was vital to both commerce and defense. Brazil was also of great importance because of its having the closest point in the Americas to Africa where the Allies were actively engaged in fighting the Germans and Italians, as well as being a vital source for strategic raw materials such as rubber, iron ore and quartz crystals, while Argentina and Uruguay were critical suppliers of foodstuffs to the Allies accepting deferred payment by Britain, which was acknowledged as a major contribution to the Allied war effort. For the Axis, the Southern Cone nations of Argentina and Chile would remain neutral until the last year of the war, an advantage which the Axis utilized to the fullest by interfering with internal affairs, conducting espionage, and distributing propaganda.

Brazil was the only country to send troops to the European Theater, was instrumental in providing air bases for the resupply of the combatants, and had an important part in the anti-submarine campaign of the Atlantic. Several other countries also had skirmishes with German U-boats and cruisers in the Caribbean and South Atlantic. Mexico sent a fighter squadron of 300 volunteers to the Pacific, the Escuadrón 201, known as the Aztec Eagles (Águilas Aztecas). Additionally, over 4,000 Argentine volunteers fought for the Allies during WWII, even though Argentina was officially a neutral country for most of the war.

The Brazilian active participation on the battlefield in Europe was sought after the Casablanca Conference. The President of the U.S., Franklin D. Roosevelt on his way back from Morocco met the President of Brazil, Getulio Vargas, in Natal, Rio Grande do Norte. This meeting is known as the Potenji River Conference, and defined the creation of the Brazilian Expeditionary Force.

== History ==
=== United States role ===
In 1940, after he expressed his concern to President Franklin D. Roosevelt over Nazi influence in Latin America, Nelson Rockefeller, grandson of Standard Oil tycoon John D. Rockefeller and later U.S. Vice President, was appointed to the new position of Coordinator of Inter-American Affairs (CIAA) in the Office of the Coordinator of Inter-American Affairs (OCIAA). Rockefeller was charged with overseeing a program of U.S. cooperation with the nations of Latin America to help raise the standard of living, to achieve better relations among the nations of the western hemisphere, and to counter rising Nazi influence in the region. He facilitated this form of cultural diplomacy by collaborating with the Director of Latin American Relations at the CBS radio network Edmund A. Chester.

Anti-fascist propaganda was a major U.S. project across Latin America, and was run by Rockefeller's office. It spent millions on radio broadcasts and motion pictures, hoping to reach a large audience. Madison Avenue techniques generated a push back in Mexico, especially, where well-informed locals resisted heavy-handed American influence. Nevertheless, Mexico was a valuable ally in the war. A deal was reached whereby 250,000 Mexican citizens living in the United States served in the American forces; over 1000 were killed in combat. In addition to propaganda, large sums were allocated for economic support and development. On the whole the Roosevelt policy was a political success, except in Argentina and Chile, which tolerated German influence, and refused to follow Washington's lead until the war was practically over.

=== Economics ===
According to author Thomas M. Leonard, World War II had a major impact on Latin American economies. Many countries were raising prices on their exports so that they could support themselves economically. Following the December 7, 1941 Japanese attack on Pearl Harbor, most of Latin America either severed relations with the Axis powers or declared war on them. As a result of the disruption of pre-war trade with Europe, many nations (including all of Central America, the Dominican Republic, Mexico, Chile, Peru, Argentina, and Venezuela) suddenly found that their dependency on the United States for trade increased. The United States' high demand for particular products and commodities during the war further distorted trade. For example, the United States wanted all of the platinum produced in Colombia, all of Chile's copper, and all of Peru's cotton. The parties agreed upon set prices, often with a high premium, but the various nations lost their ability to bargain and trade in the open market. Chile was a major exporter of nitrate to the US during the war.

Shortages of consumer goods and other products were also a problem during the war years. The demands of the American war industry and a scarcity of shipping caused many goods to be unavailable in Latin America, and so the prices for what was available increased. Gasoline and other oil products were expensive and difficult to obtain. Food shortages were a problem in the cities. Ultimately, all of these factors resulted in inflation.

Most of Latin America used the war to their advantage by siding with the United States and receiving aid. Peru, however, was an exception. In Peru, the government placed price controls on various products; hence, its foreign reserves did not increase as much as some of the other Latin American states and it lost badly needed capital. Panama also benefited economically, mainly because of increased ship traffic and goods passing through the canal.

Petroleum-rich Mexico and Venezuela benefitted from the elevated price of oil. Mexico was able to leverage favorable terms on a deal with U.S. and European oil companies for the nationalization of its oil industry in 1938. Mexican President Manuel Ávila Camacho capitalized on the situation to improve Mexico's bargaining position with the United States in general.

=== Lend-Lease ===
Under Lend-Lease, Latin America received approximately $400 million in war materials in exchange for military bases and assisting in the defense of the Western Hemisphere.

Out of all of the Latin American nations, Brazil benefited the most from Lend-Lease aid, mainly because of its geographical position at the northeastern corner of South America, which allowed for patrolling between South America and West Africa, as well as providing a ferry point for the transfer of American-made war materials to the Allies fighting in North Africa, but also because it was seen as a possible German invasion route that had to be defended. New and favorable trade treaties were signed with the United States, providing loans and military aid. Of more importance was the drop in competition for Brazil's manufacturing industry. Brazil received three-quarters of the Lend-Lease assistance distributed in Latin America. Ecuador received some, mainly for the building of an airbase in the Galapagos. Colombia and the Dominican Republic received Lend-Lease funds to modernize their militaries so they could assist in the defense of the Panama Canal and the Caribbean Sea lanes.

In contrast, Argentina and Chile received very little military aid, because for most of the war neither accepted American terms accompanying the aid that they sever relations with the Axis powers. Peru received some aid, but by 1943 the west coast of South America had lost all strategic significance, being so far away from the war's main theaters ending the justification for sending Peru Lend-Lease armaments. Central American states followed suit in declining the terms of the aid. By 1943, the Pan-American Highway, built by the United States in part for defense purposes, ceased to be a priority, and so work on the road, as well as military aid, was halted.

According to Leonard, Lend-Lease changed the balance of power in Latin America and "rekindled old rivalries." The Chilean government, for example, was very concerned about its lack of military assistance, not out of fear of an attack by Axis forces, but because it was concerned that Bolivia and Peru might attempt to use their newly acquired weapons to take back territory lost to Chile sixty years before during the War of the Pacific. Ecuador also was wary because, at the end of the Ecuadorian–Peruvian War in 1941, it had lost to Peru. Finally, Argentina was threatened by its old rival, Brazil, because of the latter's access to the latest American weaponry. Leonard says that the Argentine President Juan Perón came to power partially by claiming that he would "redress this change in military status".

=== Axis activity ===
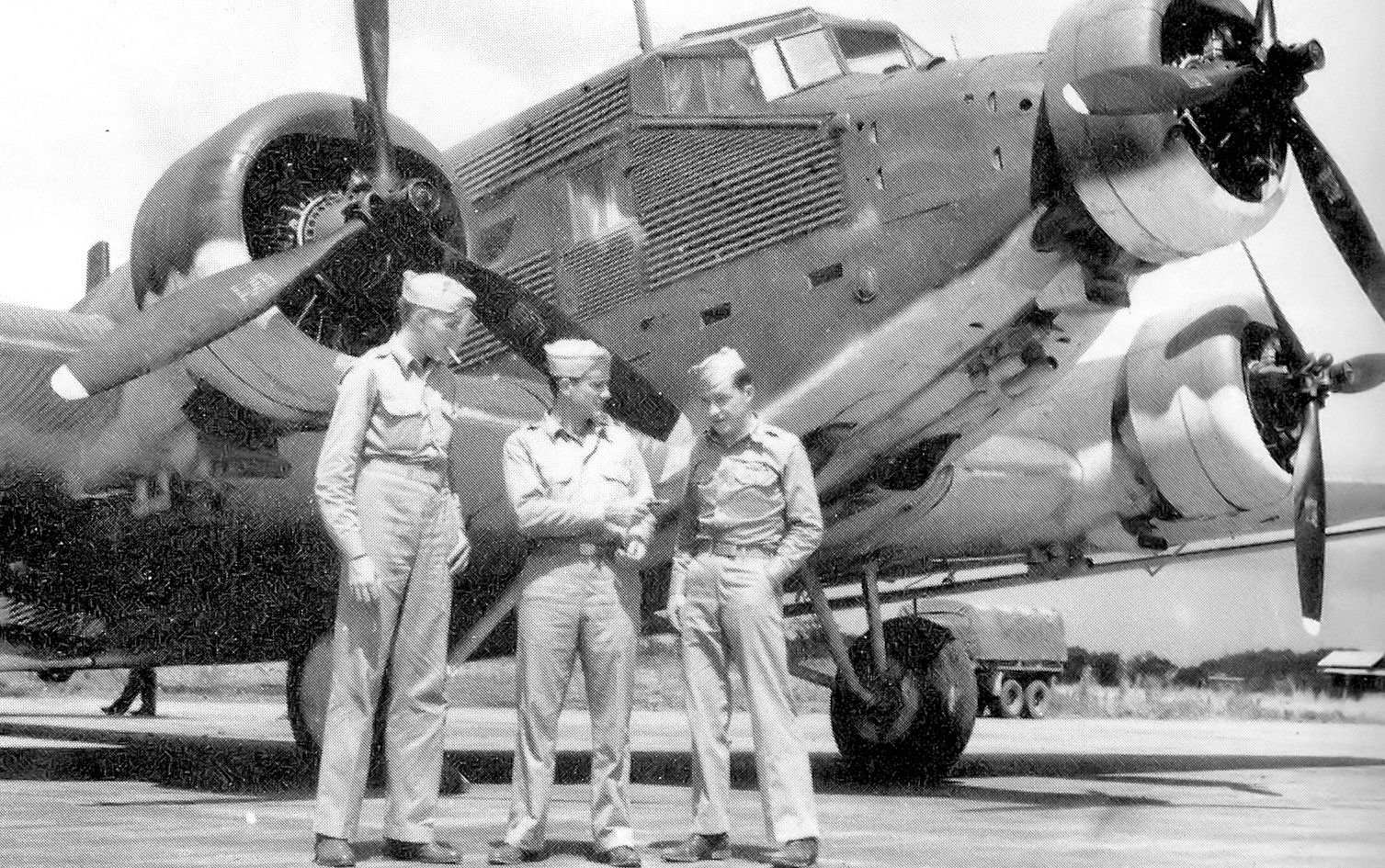
A German Junkers Ju 52/3m, which was confiscated by Peru and transferred to the United States Army Air Forces as a war prize, at Howard Field, Panama, in late 1942.

At the beginning of World War II, fascism was seen as a positive alternative by some Latin American leaders and groups that were impressed by Germany's Adolf Hitler, Italy's Benito Mussolini, Japan's Hirohito, and the dictators of the minor Axis powers. President Rafael Trujillo of the Dominican Republic, for example, admired Hitler for his style and his militaristic rallies. Similar views were held by Jorge Ubico, Tiburcio Carias Andino, and Maximiliano Hernández Martínez, the dictators of Guatemala, Honduras, and El Salvador, respectively. According to Leonard, in Brazil, Argentina, and Chile, the strong sense of unity and purpose created by fascism was quite attractive. All three nations had an influential fascist political party. Brazil's Integralists dressed in jackboots and green military-style shirts, and were open admirers of Mussolini.

In the pre-war years the Germans also enjoyed growing economic penetration using strict binational trade agreements to ensure that the economic relationship with various Latin American nations would be equal. Brazil, Mexico, Guatemala, Costa Rica, and the Dominican Republic all had trade agreements with Nazi Germany. Brazil's trade with Germany, for example, doubled between 1933, when Hitler came to power, and 1938, the year before the war began. In 1938 the contribution of South America to German imports had increased from 7.7 percent to 12.8 percent.

With the start of the war in September 1939, trade between Latin America and the Axis states almost completely ceased in the face of the Royal Navy blockade; hurting Latin American economies to varying degrees. In most cases, the United States was the only country able to replace the Axis as a trade partner.

Almost all of the Latin American states had to respond to Axis espionage activity. Mexico, and to a lesser extent Brazil, cooperated with the United States in shutting down Axis cells. Chile and Argentina, on the other hand, allowed Axis agents to operate in their countries for most of the war, which was a source of considerable discord between the two nations and the United States. Many of the Latin American states also had to deal with large numbers of immigrants from Axis countries. Colombia, for example, had a population of about 4,000 German immigrants in 1941, as well as a small village of Japanese farmers in Cauca. Many of the Germans in Colombia were involved in the air transportation industry as employees of SCADTA, so the United States was concerned that they might be engaged in espionage or even plot to convert civilian aircraft into bombers for an attack against the Panama Canal. As a result, the United States government pressured Colombia into monitoring and interning the immigrants or, in some cases, deporting them to the United States. The same occurred in other Latin American countries as well.

The threat of German and Spanish espionage was much more real. Throughout much of the war, the Germans operated spy networks in all of the most prominent countries of the region, including Argentina, Chile, Paraguay, Brazil, Cuba, Mexico, Venezuela and others. Operation Bolivar, as it was called, was centered on clandestine radio communications from their base in Argentina to Berlin in Germany, but it also utilized Spanish merchant vessels for the shipment of paper-form intelligence back to Europe. The latter was possible because of Spanish cooperation with German intelligence agencies during the war. Although Argentina and Chile eventually cracked down on the Axis agents operating in their countries in early 1944, some Bolivar activity continued up until the end of the European war in May 1945.

In addition to German espionage and sabotage in Latin America, the United States was also concerned about Nazi propaganda. For example, Germany's embassy in Guatemala City served as the distribution center for Nazi propaganda in Central America. Prior to the beginning of the war in 1939, the propaganda focused on the superiority of German manufactured goods, and claimed that Germany was the center for scientific research, because it had the "world's most advanced educational system." Between September 1939 and late 1943, the propaganda focused on German victories and the superiority of its military equipment. From Guatemala the propaganda made its way to the German embassies in other countries, often as packages aboard the Salvadoran airline TACA.

=== Soviet–Latin American relations ===
Hitler's invasion of June 1941 provoked support and aid for the Soviet Union in many countries in Latin America, generally organized through voluntary organizations or trade unions. Cuba dispatched 40,000 cigars to the Red Army and in October 1942 became the first Latin American country to extend diplomatic recognition to the USSR. More generally, the war led to a diplomatic thaw: by 1945, 11 Latin American states, including Argentina, Colombia, Chile, Venezuela, and the Central American republics, had normalized relations with Moscow.

At the end of World War II in Europe, Mexican president Manuel Ávila Camacho declared: "Al enterarme del retroceso definitivo del Ejército alemán recuerdo junto con mi país los esfuerzos admirables del heroico pueblo soviético durante los años de la lucha contra las tropas fascistas." (Upon hearing of the final defeat of the German army, I, along with my country, remembered the admirable efforts of the heroic Soviet people during the years of struggle against fascist troops.)

=== Regional impacts ===
==== Brazil in World War II ====
After World War I, in which Brazil was an ally of the United States, Great Britain, and France, the country realized it needed a more capable army but did not have the technology to create it. In 1919, the French Military Mission was established by the French Commission in Brazil. Their main goal was to contain internal rebellions in Brazil. They tried to assist the army by bringing them up to the European military standard, but constant civil missions did not prepare them for World War II. Brazil's president, Getúlio Vargas, wanted to industrialize Brazil and make it more competitive with other countries. He reached out to Germany, Italy, France, and the United States as trade allies. Many Italian and German people had immigrated to Brazil many years before World War II which created a Nazi influence. The immigrants held high positions in government and the armed forces.

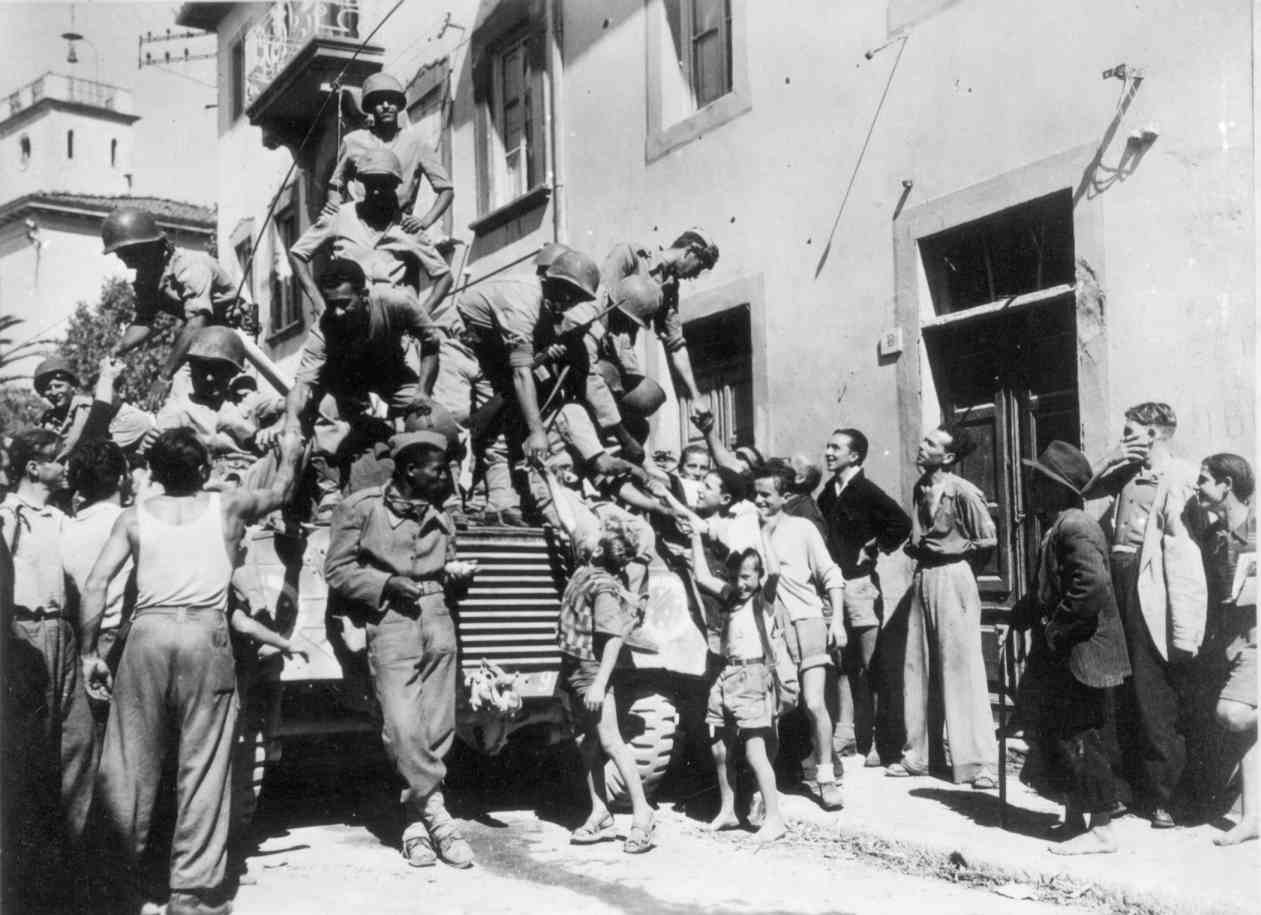
Brazilian soldiers greet Italian civilians in the city of Massarosa, September 1944. Brazil was the only independent Latin American country to send ground troops to fight in WW II.

Brazil remained neutral during the interwar but attended continental meetings in Buenos Aires, Argentina (1936); Lima, Peru (1938); and Havana, Cuba (1940) that obligated them to agree to defend any part of the Americas if attacked. Brazil stopped trading with Germany once Germany began attacking offshore trading ships, resulting in Germany declaring a blockade against the Americas in the Atlantic Ocean. Once German submarines attacked unarmed Brazilian trading ships, President Vargas met with Roosevelt to discuss how to retaliate. On 22 January 1942, Brazil officially ended all relations with Germany, Japan, and Italy, and joined the Allies.

The Brazilian Expeditionary Force was sent to Naples, Italy to fight with the Allied Powers. Brazil was the only Latin American country to send troops to Europe. Initially, Brazil wanted to only provide resources and shelter for the war to have a chance of gaining a high postwar status but ended up sending 25,000 men to fight.

After World War II, the United States and Latin America continued to have a close relationship. For example, USAID created family planning programs in Latin America combining the NGOs already in place, providing women in largely Catholic areas with access to contraception.

==== Mexico in World War II ====
In 1941, Mexico had a much more friendly relationship with the United States compared to during World War I where the country had a more noticeably pro-German attitude. Mexico cut off diplomatic relations with Japan a day after the Attack on Pearl Harbor. Three days after the attack, it did the same to Germany and Italy.

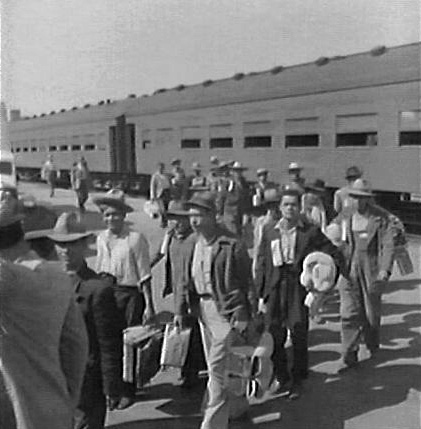
The first Braceros arrive in Los Angeles, 1942.

Mexico entered World War II in response to German attacks on Mexican ships. The Potrero del Llano, originally an Italian tanker, had been seized in port by the Mexican government in April 1941 and renamed after a region in Veracruz. It was attacked and crippled by the German submarine U-564 on May 13, 1942. The attack killed 13 of 35 crewmen. On May 21, 1942, a second tanker, Faja de Oro, also a seized Italian ship, was attacked and sunk by the German submarine U-160, killing 10 of 37 crewmen. In response to the torpedoing of the two ships, Mexico would declare war on May 30, 1942 on Germany, Italy and Japan.

A large part of Mexico's contribution to the war came through an agreement in January 1942 that allowed Mexican nationals living in the United States to join the U.S. armed forces. As many as 250,000 Mexicans served in this way. In the final year of the war, Mexico sent one air squadron to serve under the Mexican flag: the Mexican Air Force's Escuadrón Aéreo de Pelea 201 (201st Fighter Squadron), which saw combat in the Philippines in the war against Imperial Japan. Mexico was the only Latin-American country to send troops to the Asia-Pacific theatre of the war. In addition to those in the armed forces, tens of thousands of Mexican men were hired as farm workers in the United States during the war years through the Bracero program, which continued and expanded in the decades after the war.

World War II helped spark an era of rapid industrialization known as the Mexican Miracle. Mexico supplied the United States with more strategic raw materials than any other country, and American aid spurred the growth of industry. President Ávila was able to use the increased revenue to improve the country's credit, invest in infrastructure, subsidize food, and raise wages.

==== World War II and the Caribbean ====
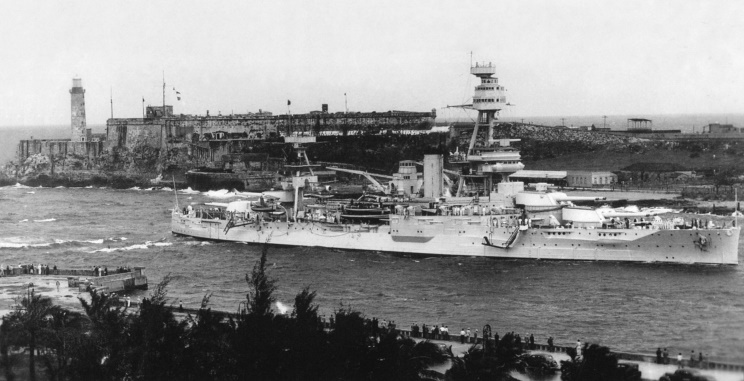
With Morro Castle in the background, USS Texas sails into Havana Harbor, February 1940.

President Federico Laredo Brú led Cuba when war broke out in Europe, though real power belonged to Fulgencio Batista as the army's Chief of Staff. In 1940, Brú infamously denied entry to 900 Jewish refugees who arrived in Havana aboard MS St. Louis. After both the United States and Canada likewise refused to accept the refugees, they returned to Europe, where many were eventually murdered in the Holocaust. Batista became president in his own right following the 1940 election. He cooperated with the United States as it moved closer to war against the Axis. Cuba declared war on Japan on December 8, 1941, and on Germany and Italy on December 11.

Cuba was an important participant in the Battle of the Caribbean and its navy gained a reputation for skill and efficiency. The navy escorted hundreds of Allied ships through hostile waters, flew thousands of hours on convoy and patrol duty, and rescued over 200 victims of German U-boat attacks from the sea. Six Cuban merchant ships were sunk by U-boats, taking the lives of around eighty sailors. On May 15, 1943, a squadron of Cuban submarine chasers sank the German submarine U-176 near Cayo Blanquizal. Cuba received millions of dollars in American military aid through the Lend-Lease program, which included air bases, aircraft, weapons, and training. The United States naval station at Guantanamo Bay also served as a base for convoys passing between the mainland United States and the Panama Canal or other points in the Caribbean.

The Dominican Republic declared war on Germany and Japan following the Attack on Pearl Harbor and the Nazi declaration of war on the US. It did not directly contribute with troops, aircraft, or ships, however 112 Dominicans joined the US military and fought in the war. On May 3, 1942, the German submarine U-125 sank the Dominican ship San Rafael with one torpedo and 32 rounds from the deck gun 50 miles (80 km) west off Jamaica; one was killed, but 37 survived. On May 21, 1942, the German submarine U-156 sank the Dominican ship Presidente Trujillo off Fort-de-France, Martinique; 24 were killed, 15 survived. Rumors of pro-Nazi Dominicans supplying German U-boats with food, water and fuel abounded during the war.

=== Jewish passports-El Salvador ===
As Jewish refugees sought to escape persecution in Axis-controlled Europe, Colonel José Castellanos Contreras, the Salvadoran Consul General in Geneva, Switzerland, helped protect 40,000 Jewish refugees by providing them with Salvadoran passports, which could be used as a form of political asylum. This was a very quiet and unrecognized part of El Salvador's contribution in World War II.

=== Postwar Nazi flight ===
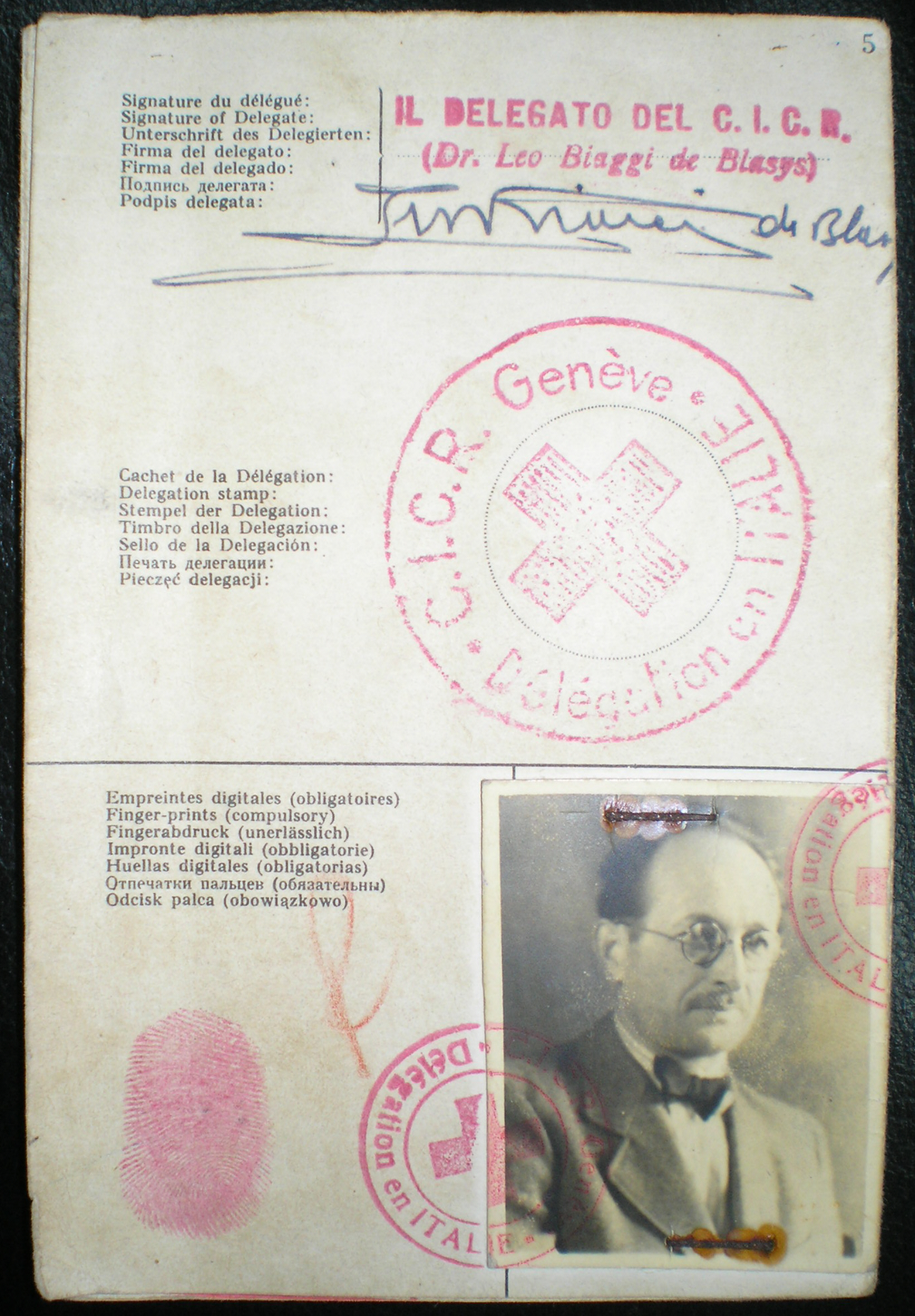
False passport of Nazi Adolf Eichmann in the name of Ricardo Klement, issued by the Red Cross in Switzerland by an Italian official. Eichmann entered Argentina under this name

In the immediate aftermath of World War II and the defeat of fascism, as many as 9,000 Nazis and other fascists escaped Europe to South America via ratlines, including Croats, Ukrainians, Russians, and other Europeans who aided the Nazi war machine. Most, perhaps as many as 5,000, went to Argentina; between 1,500 and 2,000 may have made it to Brazil; around 500 to 1,000 to Chile; and the rest to Paraguay and Uruguay.

The ratlines were supported by rogue elements in the Vatican, particularly an Austrian bishop and four Croatian clergy of the Catholic Church who sympathized with the Ustaše. Argentina was a favored destination, because of its large German population and the support of the government of Juan Domingo Perón.

Starting in 1947, U.S. Intelligence utilized existing ratlines to move certain Nazi strategists and scientists. In some cases, the U.S. was complicit in the exodus of Nazi war criminals to South America. Following the war, the U.S. Counter-Intelligence Corps recruited Klaus Barbie—the Gestapo chief in Lyon, France, who played a role in the deaths of thousands of French Jews and members of the French Resistance—as an agent to assist with anti-Communist efforts. He was smuggled to Bolivia, where he continued his spy work and instructed the military regime on how to torture and interrogate political opponents.

Many of the Nazis who escaped to South America were never brought to justice. SS colonel Walter Rauff, who created mobile gas chambers that killed at least 100,000 people, died in Chile in 1984. Eduard Roschmann, the “Butcher of Riga,” died in Paraguay in 1977. Gustav Wagner, an SS officer known as the “Beast,” died in Brazil in 1980 after the country’s supreme federal court refused to extradite him to Germany because of inaccuracies in the paperwork. Prominent Nazis Adolf Eichmann and Josef Mengele were able to flee to Argentina from Europe. Both lived undetected for years, with Mengele dying in Brazil. Israeli intelligence tracked down Eichmann, living under an assumed name, and abducted and brought him to Israel to stand trial. He was executed. Eventually, collaboration between the government and the Simon Wiesenthal Center, led to the arrest of other notorious war criminals such as Priebke and Kutschmann.

== Gallery ==
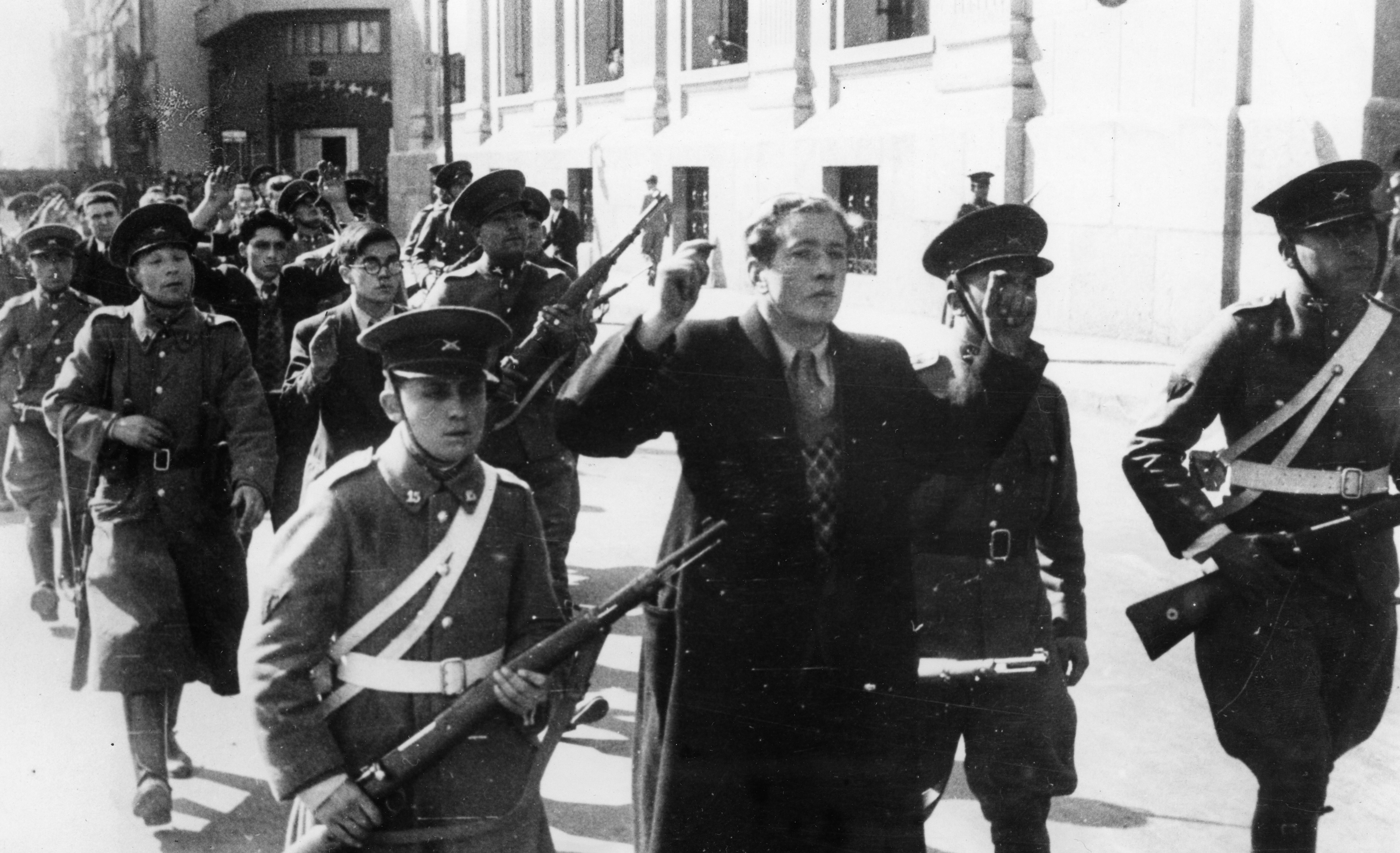
National police escorting members of the National Socialist Movement of Chile during the Seguro Obrero Uprising. On September 5, 1938, after four hours of fighting in Santiago, Chilean authorities rounded up and executed nearly sixty rebels who had surrendered. About twenty others were killed during the fighting.

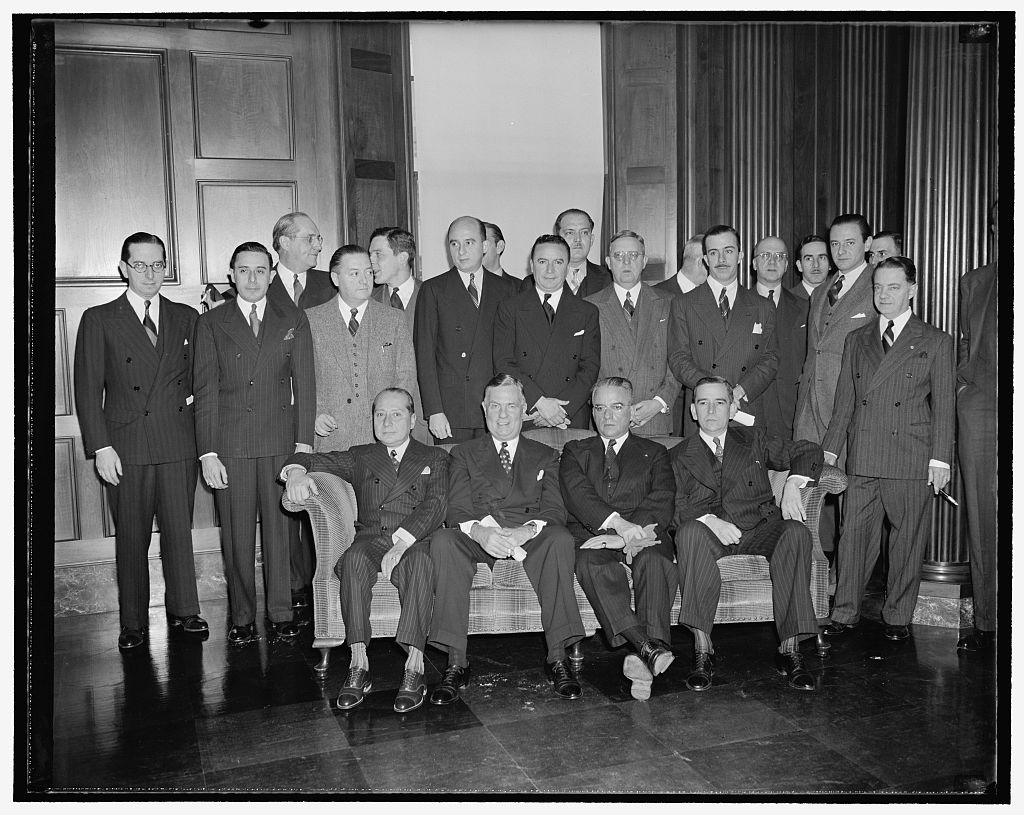
Representatives of Latin American governments and United States retailers during a meeting in Washington, D.C. on November 1, 1939, to discuss a means of increasing trade in the Western Hemisphere.

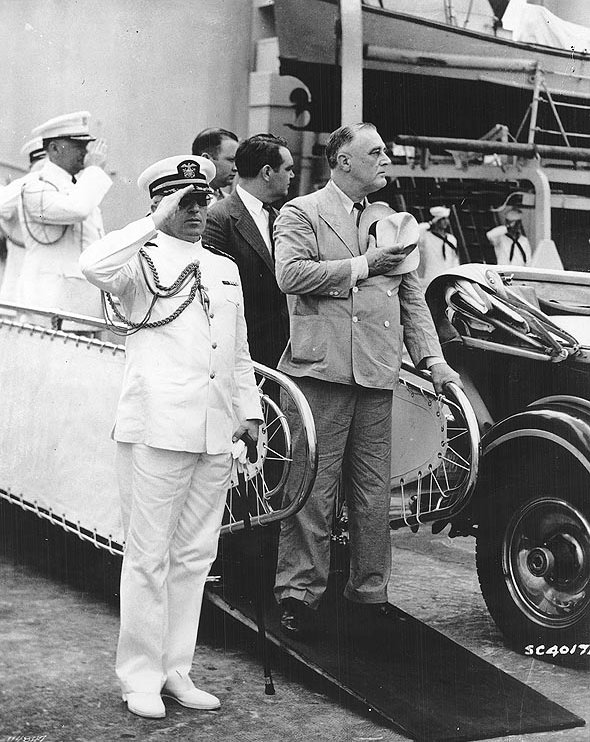
President Roosevelt and his Naval Aide, Captain Daniel J. Callaghan, disembarking from USS Tuscaloosa at Gatun Locks, Panama, on February 18, 1940.

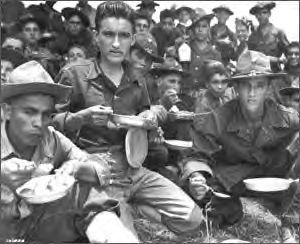
Soldiers of the American 65th Infantry Regiment in Salinas, Puerto Rico, in August 1941.

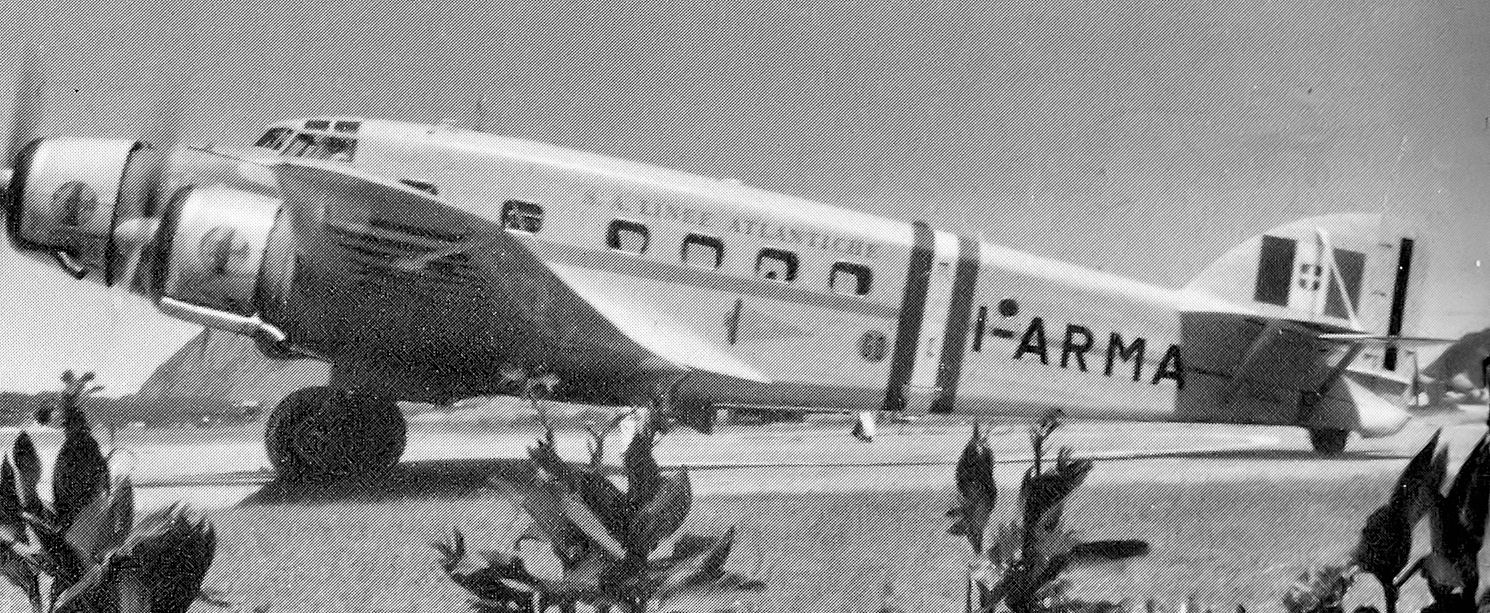
An Italian Savoia-Marchetti SM.81 tri-motor airliner at Howard Field in 1942. This aircraft, which was acquired by the United States from the Italian-Latin American Airline (LATI), was seized in Chile by local government officials and donated to the United States Army because of shortage of transports in Central America.

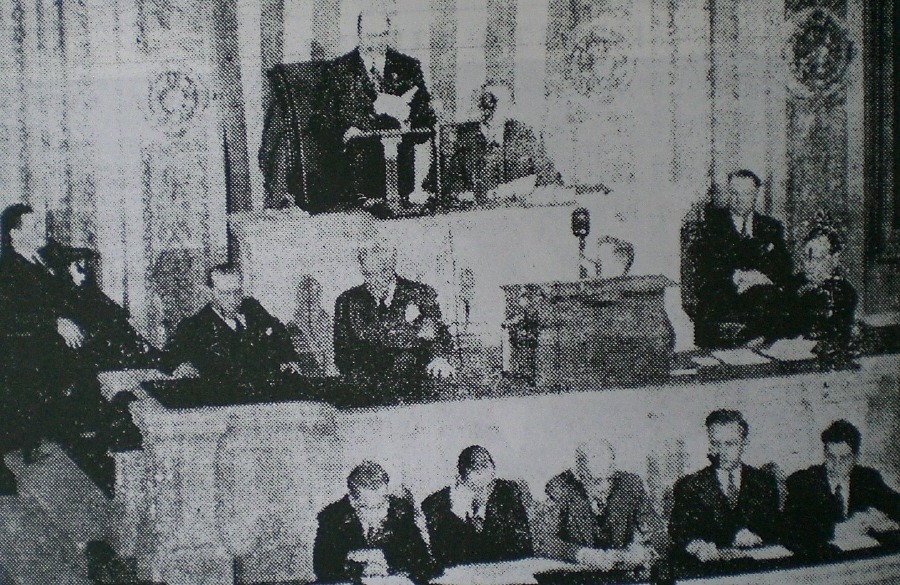
President Isaías Medina Angarita of Venezuela speaking to Congress during his official state visit to the United States in 1944.

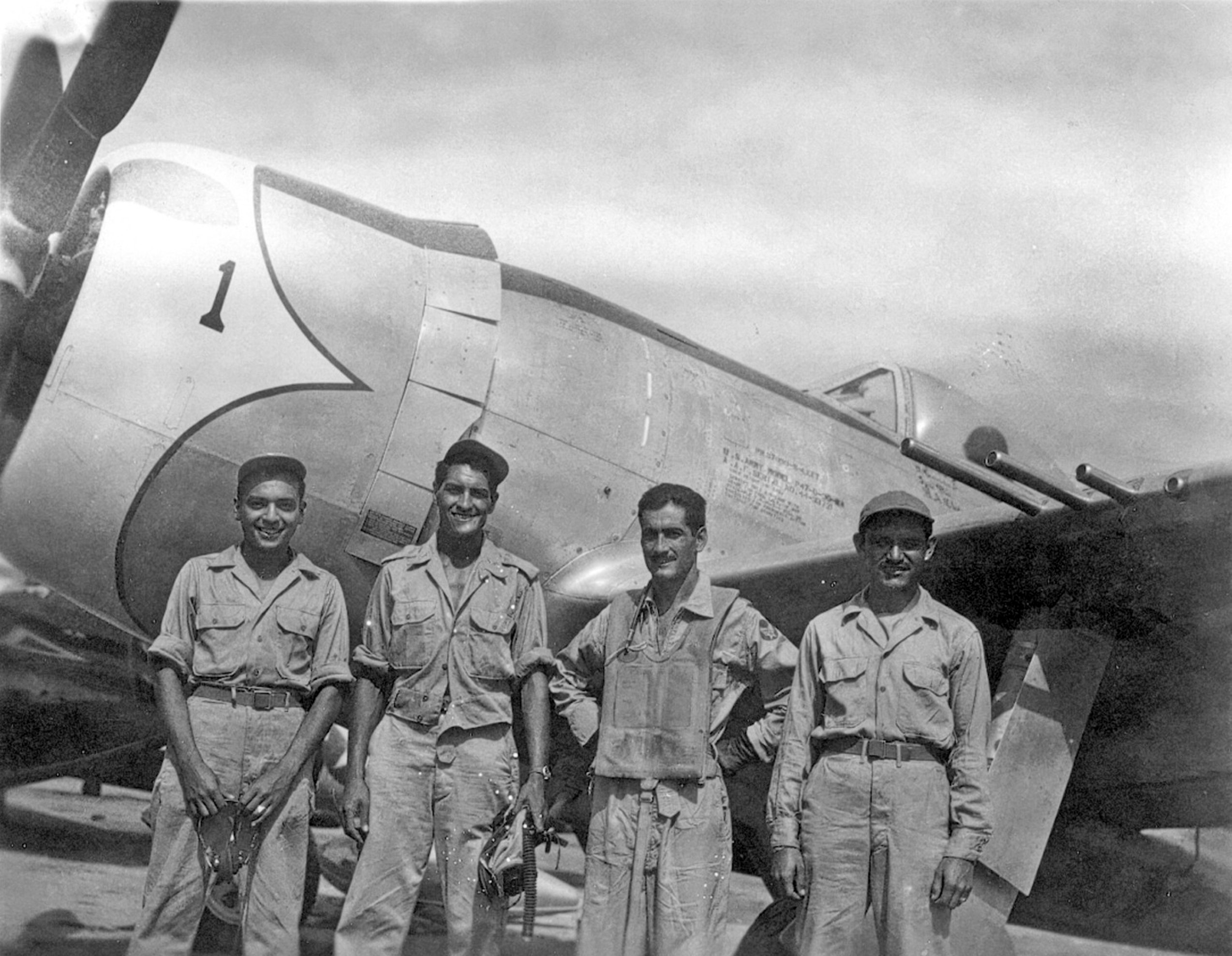
Members of Mexico's 201st Air Fighter Squadron and a P-47 Thunderbolt during the Philippines Campaign in 1945.

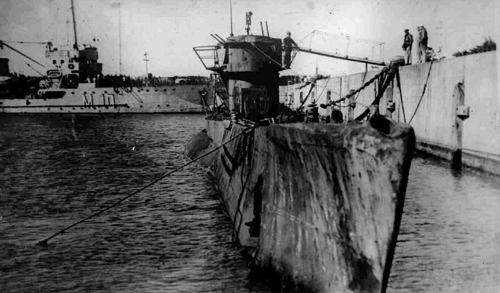
The German submarine U-977 moored at Mar del Plata following her surrender to the Argentine Navy in August 1945.

== See also ==
- Argentina during World War II
- Bolivia during World War II
- Brazil during World War II
- Colombia during World War II
- Cuba during World War II
- Diplomatic history of World War II
- El Salvador during World War II
- Honduras in World War II
- Mexico during World War II
- Paraguay during World War II
- Uruguay during World War II
- Venezuela during World War II
