= Raúl Morales Beltramí =

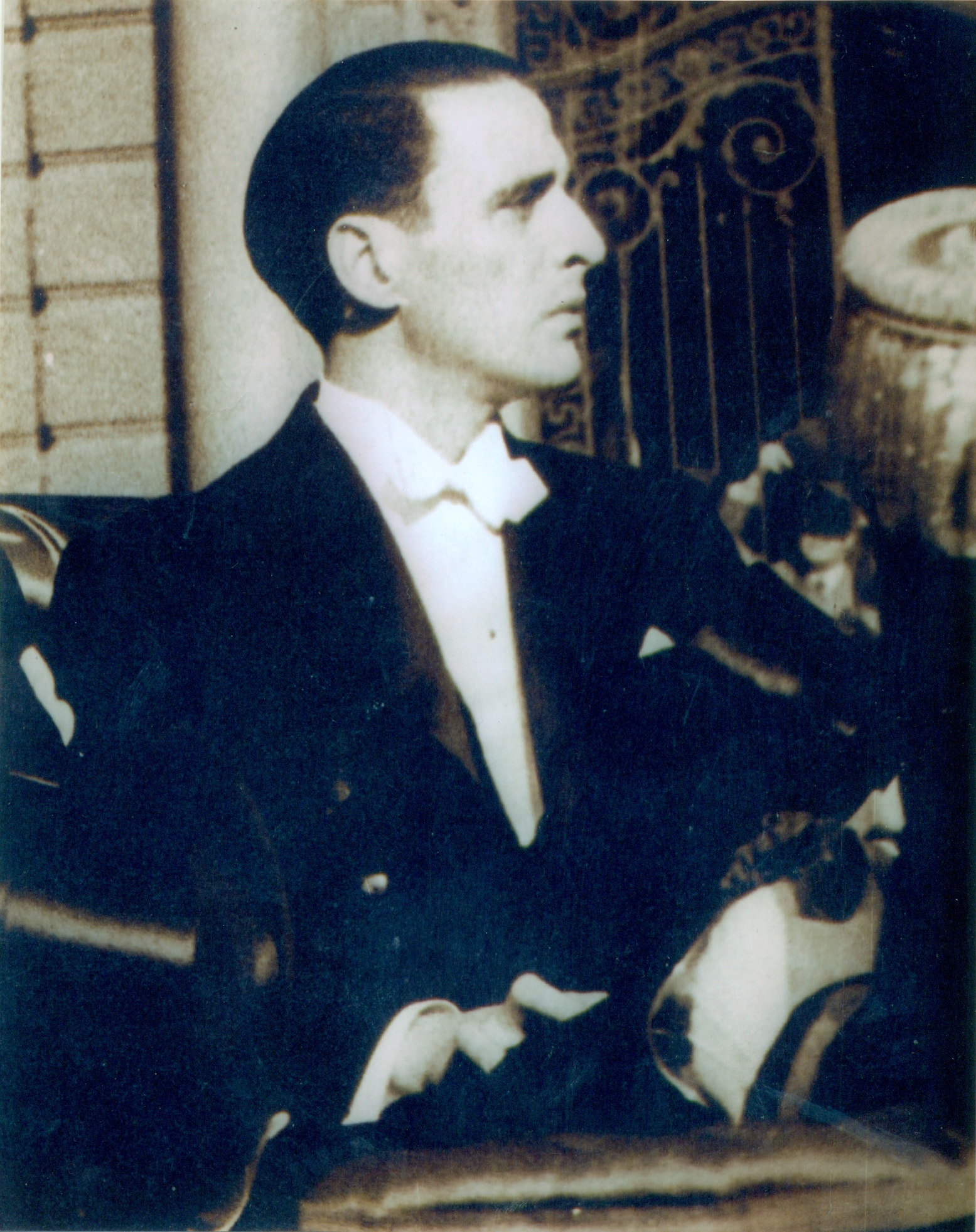

Ambassador of Chile to Brazil
- In office 7 June 1943 – 12 February 1946
- President: Juan Antonio Ríos
- Preceded by: Gabriel González Videla
- Succeeded by: Osvaldo Vial

Minister of the Interior
- In office 2 April 1942 – 7 June 1943
- President: Juan Antonio Ríos
- Preceded by: Alfredo Rosende
- Succeeded by: Julio Allard Pinto

Member of the Chamber of Deputies
- In office 15 May 1937 – 15 May 1941
- Constituency: 24th Departmental Grouping (Ancud, Castro, and Quinchao)
- In office 15 May 1933 – 15 May 1937
- Constituency: 24th Departmental Grouping (Ancud and Castro)

Governor of Ancud
- In office 1933–1933

Personal details
- Born: 8 December 1906 Santiago, Chile
- Died: 12 February 1946 (aged 39) Rio de Janeiro, Brazil
- Party: Radical Party
- Spouse(s): Guillermina Adriasola Espejo; Raquel Barcia
- Children: 4, including Raúl Hernán and Jorge
- Education: University of Chile
- Profession: Physician and surgeon

Raúl Morales Beltramí (8 December 1906 – 12 February 1946) was a Chilean physician, surgeon, and politician.

A member of the Radical Party, he served as the first Minister of the Interior under President Juan Antonio Ríos from 1942 to 1943. As a physician, he specialised in dermatology and conducted work on the treatment of syphilis.

== Early life ==
Morales was born in Santiago, Chile, on 8 December 1906, the son of Guillermo Morales and Emilia Beltramí. He attended the Instituto Nacional General José Miguel Carrera and later studied medicine at the University of Chile. He specialised in dermatology and completed a thesis entitled El Myo Salvarsan: contribución al estudio de su actuación en el tratamiento de la sífilis, concerning the use of Salvarsan in the treatment of syphilis.

During the government of General Carlos Ibáñez del Campo, Morales was deported to Chiloé Island, where he subsequently practised medicine. He initially worked in Ancud, where he was involved in the establishment of the city's hospital. He later returned to Santiago and served as director of the newspaper La Hora.

Morales also served as medical director of the Caja de Empleados Particulares and as executive vice-president of the Servicio Médico Nacional de Empleados.

== Political career ==
Morales became active in the Radical Party and participated in the establishment of the Popular Front. In 1933, he served as governor of Ancud. That year, he was elected to the Chamber of Deputies of Chile for the 24th Departmental Grouping of Ancud and Castro. He was re-elected in 1937, representing the grouping of Ancud, Castro, and Quinchao, and served until 1941.

Morales subsequently played a senior role in Juan Antonio Ríos's presidential campaign. Following Ríos's election, Morales was appointed Minister of the Interior on 2 April 1942. His tenure coincided with wartime rationing measures and increasing tensions between the Ríos administration and the leadership of the Radical Party.

During his time at the Interior Ministry, Law No. 7,200 provided for the reorganisation of public offices, while measures were adopted concerning the autonomy of the Comptroller General of the Republic and petrol rationing. The government also began prospecting work at Springhill in Tierra del Fuego, established the Ministry of Economy, continued the industrial development programme of CORFO, and began the construction of dams. The government also confronted an attempted coup d'état and outlawed the National Socialist Movement of Chile.

In 1943, tensions between Morales and the Radical Party leadership increased amid discussion of a proposed presidential visit by Ríos to the United States. Party leaders opposed the possibility that Morales, as Minister of the Interior, might assume the vice-presidency during the president's absence. Amid these disagreements, Morales submitted his resignation, which Ríos accepted on 7 June 1943. He subsequently left the Radical Party and withdrew from active domestic politics. He was succeeded at the Interior Ministry by Vice Admiral Julio Allard Pinto.

Morales later accepted an appointment from Ríos as Chilean ambassador to Brazil. He died in Rio de Janeiro on 12 February 1946, aged 39, while serving as ambassador. His son Raúl Morales Adriasola later served as President of the Chamber of Deputies of Chile.
