= SS Tolten =

Chilean cargo ship, sunk by a German submarine in 1942

History

Chile
- Name: Lotta (1938–1941); Tolten (1941–1942)
- Owner: Cia. Sud Americana De Vapores - CSAV
- Port of registry: Valparaíso, Chile
- Builder: Aalborg Værft A/S
- Yard number: 58
- Launched: 22 April 1938
- Completed: 21 June 1938
- Fate: Torpedoed and sunk 13 March 1942

General characteristics
- Type: Cargo ship
- Tonnage: 1,858 GRT
- Length: 90.9 m (298 ft 3 in)
- Beam: 13.3 m (43 ft 8 in)
- Depth: 5.3 m (17 ft 5 in)
- Installed power: 1 x 3 cyl. compound expansion steam engine
- Propulsion: Screw propeller
- Speed: 12.5 knots (23.2 km/h; 14.4 mph)
- Crew: 27

SS Tolten was a Chilean cargo ship that was torpedoed by the German submarine U-404 in the Atlantic Ocean 32 nautical miles (59 km) off Barnegat, New Jersey, United States on 13 March 1942 while she was travelling from Baltimore to New York City, United States, in ballast.

== Construction ==
Tolten was built at the Aalborg Værft A/S shipyard in Aalborg, Denmark in June 1938. This is where she was launched and completed that same year. The ship was 90.9 metres (298 ft 3 in) long, had a beam of 13.3 metres (43 ft 8 in) and had a depth of 5.3 metres (17 ft 5 in). She was assessed at 1,858 gross register tons (GRT) and was powered by steam created in steam boilers supplied to one three-cylinder compound expansion engine and an L.P. turbine with SR driving a single screw propeller. The ship could generate 231 nhp with a speed of 12.5 knots (23.2 km/h; 14.4 mph).

== Sinking ==
The neutral Tolten was travelling unescorted from Baltimore, Maryland, to New York City, United States, in ballast when on 13 March 1942 at 6.43 am, she was hit near the bridge by a torpedo from the German submarine U-404 in the Atlantic Ocean 32 nautical miles (59 km; 37 mi) off Barnegat, New Jersey, United States. The ship sank in six minutes and it was only after her sinking that the U-boat crew confirmed the ship to be Chilean.

All but one of her 27 crew died in the sinking. A fireman named Julio Faust Rivera was blown overboard by the torpedo impact and managed to swim to a loose raft before passing out. He was rescued 12 hours later by USS Larch and brought to the Marine Hospital at Stapleton, Staten Island. The sinking led to diplomatic tension between Chile and Germany with an unfavorable reaction from the Chilean foreign minister and anti-German demonstrations in Chile. Chile would sever relations with the Axis Powers the following year, declaring war on Japan in 1945.

== Wreck ==
The wreck of Tolten lies at (40°10′N 73°50′W).
