= Sergio Carbó =

Cuban politician (1891–1971)

Cuban Secretary of War
- In office September 5, 1933 – September 10, 1933
- Constituency: Republic of Cuba

Personal details
- Born: Sergio Carbó y Morera; July 29, 1891 La Habana, Cuba
- Died: April 18, 1971 (aged 79) Miami, United States
- Party: Cuban Revolutionary Party
- Children: Ulises Carbo

Sergio Carbó y Morera (July 29, 1891 - April 18, 1971) was a prominent Conservative journalist and leader of the Cuban Revolutionary party.

== Early history ==
Sergio Carbó was born in the La Habana Province of Cuba.

== Journalism ==
Sergio Carbó was the founder and the editor-in-chief of La Semana, a weekly political commentary journal, in 1925. He started Zig-Zag in 1938 which was later re-established in Miami in 1960. From 1941 to 1960, he was the owner and director of the daily Havana newspaper Prensa Libre.

Carbó had been detained in the political prison at La Cabaña Fortress in January 1931, for publishing content in his newspaper, La Semana, that the government found objectionable prior to his eventual release in February 1931.

== Rise to power ==
=== Revolutionary expedition ===
In May 1931, Carbó and Carlos Hevia equipped and led an expeditionary force from the United States which landed in Gíbara, a small community in the province of Oriente (now Holguín Province). It was an attempt to oust Gerardo Machado's dictatorship, but it was suppressed by Machado's army. Carbó was later charged with inspiring a rebellion in Oriente Province.

=== Cuban Revolution of 1933 ===
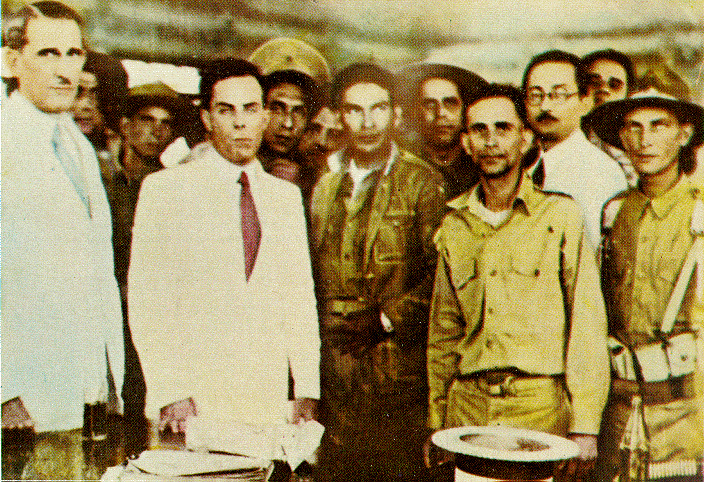
The leaders of the 1933 Sergeants' revolution, from the left in the picture, Dr. Ramón Grau, Sergio Carbó, and Sgt. Fulgencio Batista.

In August 1933, an army revolt in Havana forced President Machado to flee Cuba and he was succeeded by Carlos Manuel de Céspedes y Quesada. The Céspedes administration assumed power on August 12, 1933, until Sergeant Fulgencio Batista staged a coup d'état called the Sergeants' Revolt on September 4, 1933. Carbó was a leading factor in the uprising which brought the downfall of the Cespedes' presidency.

=== Pentarchy of 1933 ===
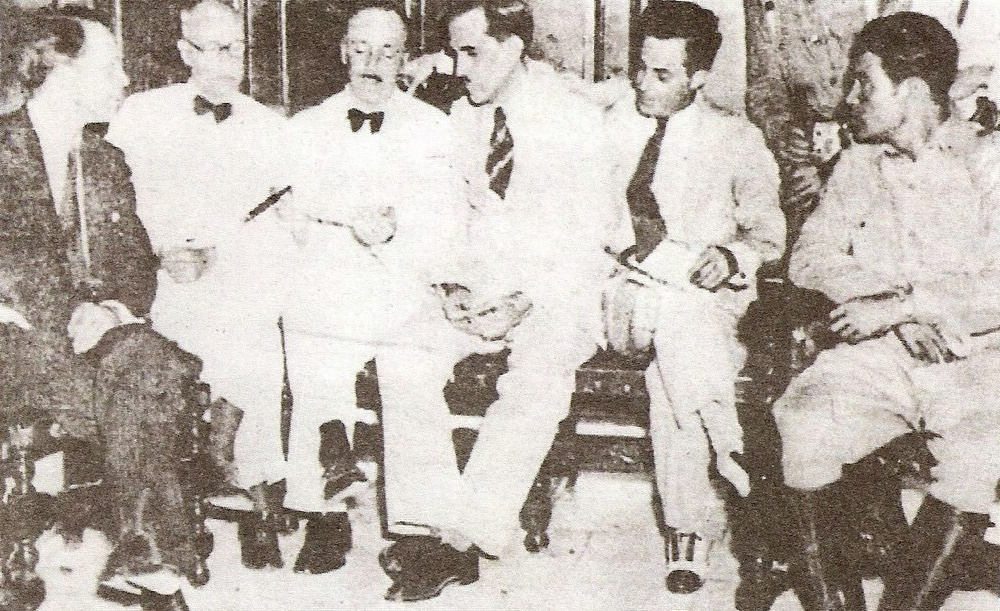
The five members of the pentarchy, from the left in the picture, Josée M. Irisari, Porfirio Franca, Guillermo Portela, Ramon Grau, and Sergio Carbó.

An executive committee of five men including Carbó, Dr. Ramón Grau, José Irisarri, Dr. Guillermo Portela, and Porfirio Franca replaced the Céspedes cabinet as Cuba's governmental leaders. On the committee, Carbó, a member of the Student Directory, acted as the Secretary of War. Following the coup, the five-member junta—also referred to as The Pentarquia—served as a transitional administration for just five days.

=== One Hundred Days Government ===
Within a week, Dr. Ramón Grau was promoted to president, replacing the Pentarchy with the One Hundred Days Government on September 10, 1933. On November 13, 1933, Carbó accused the United States ambassador to Cuba, Sumner Welles, of supporting an attempted uprising against President Grau's regime and asked that he be removed from his post. On January 15, 1934, Sergeant Batista forced Grau to resign, ending Grau's government of slightly more than a hundred days.

On October 16, 1934, Carbó was declared not guilty in an urgency court of publishing articles against the government.

Carbó was an officer of the exile group, the Cuban Revolutionary Council and on April 21, 1961, he was acting as coordinator-general of the anti-Castro Cuban Democratic Revolutionary Front (FRD).

== Death ==
Sergio Carbó died in Miami, Florida at Mercy Hospital on April 18, 1971.
