= José Irisarri =

Cuban politician and lawyer (1895–1968)

José M. Irisarri

Minister of Public Works and Agriculture
- In office 5 September 1933 – 10 September 1933
- President: Executive Commission of the Provisional Government of Cuba

Minister of Finance
- In office 18 July 1942 – 1943
- President: Fulgencio Batista
- In office 10 October 1944 – 10 October 1948
- President: Ramón Grau

Personal details
- Born: José Miguel Irisarri y Gamio; 31 August 1895 Abreus, Santa Clara Province (now Cienfuegos Province), Captaincy General of Cuba, Spanish Empire
- Died: 1968 (aged 72–73)
- Party: Partido Auténtico
- Children: 3

José Miguel Irisarri y Gamio (31 August 1895 – 1968) was a Cuban politician and lawyer who served as Minister of Public Works and Agriculture in the Pentarchy of 1933, which ruled Cuba from 5 to 10 September. He later served as Minister of Finance from 18 July 1942 to 1943 under Fulgencio Batista and from 10 October 1944 to 10 October 1948 under Ramón Grau. Irisarri was a member of the Partido Auténtico.

== Early life and career ==
José Miguel Irisarri y Gamio was born in Abreus, Santa Clara Province (now Cienfuegos Province), Spanish Cuba, on 31 August 1895. He completed his early studies in Spain.

From 1923 to 1924, he participated in the Veterans' And Patriots' Movement led by Carlos García Vélez in opposition to the Alfredo Zayas y Alfonso administration. Educated as a lawyer, Irisarri participated in a debate at the Havana Bar Association on 17 January 1930.

Irisarri was an early member of the Directorio Estudiantil Universitario (English: Directorate of University Students) established at the University of Havana. For rejecting the presidency of a Gerardo Machado electoral district, he was imprisoned for two years in Castillo del Príncipe on the Isle of Pines. He went into exile in May 1931 and returned to Cuba amid the Carlos Manuel de Céspedes y Quesada presidency.

During this period, Sumner Welles reported that Irisarri was a law partner of Cuban President Mario García Menocal's son-in-law, Eugenio Sardina.

== Pentarchy of 1933 ==
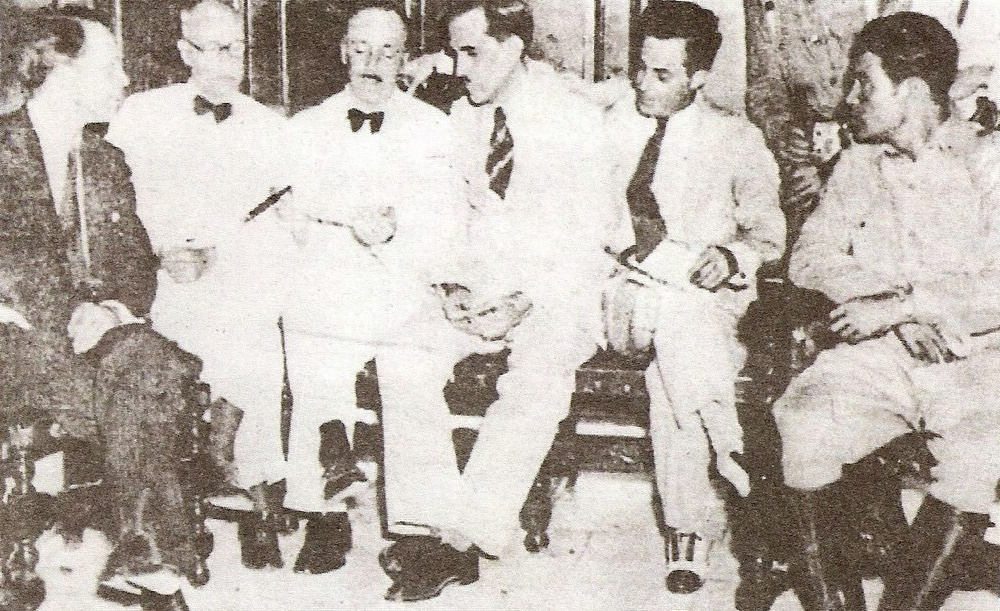
The five members of the pentarchy, from the left in the picture, José M. Irisarri, Porfirio Franca, Guillermo Portela, Ramon Grau, and Sergio Carbó.

In September 1933, Irisarri was a part of the brief provisional government of Cuba, known as the Pentarchy of 1933, which included Porfirio Franca, Guillermo Portela, Ramón Grau, and Sergio Carbó. The short-lived Pentarchy lasted for 5 days before being replaced by the One Hundred Days Government. Irisarri remained closely connected to the Cuban political party, Partido Auténtico, founded in 1934.

In the early 1940s, Irisarri headed Cuba's Import and Export Agency.

On 18 July 1942, President Fulgencio Batista issued a decree appointing Dr. Irisarri as Minister of Finance. By 1943, he left his position by submitting his resignation.

In 1943, while in Havana, he consulted with Frank Southard of the Navy Department and E.M. Bernstein of the Treasury Department about creating a Cuban central bank.

During Ramón Grau's presidency from 1944 to 1948, Irisarri served in his cabinet as Minister of Finance. In 1948, Grau's successor, Carlos Prío Socarrás, became president, establishing the Partido Auténtico government. On 20 December 1950, President Prío signed a law to establish the Agricultural and Industrial Development Bank. In January 1951, Irissari was appointed vice president of the bank's Agricultural Division, headquartered in Havana. After Fulgencio Batista's 1952 Cuban coup d'état deposed President Prío, Irisarri immediately resigned from the position he held.

He kept practicing law as an attorney and was listed in 1956 with an office in the Almendares neighborhood of Havana.

== Death ==
Irisarri died in 1968.
