= Porfirio Franca =

Cuban Commissioner of Finance

Porfirio Franca y Álvarez de la Campa

Commissioner of Finance
- In office September 5, 1933 – September 10, 1933
- Constituency: Republic of Cuba

Personal details
- Born: Porfirio Franca y Álvarez de la Campa; July 22, 1878 Havana, Cuba
- Died: May 3, 1950 (aged 71)
- Children: 3

Porfirio Franca y Álvarez de la Campa (July 22, 1878 – May 3, 1950) was a Cuban Conservative business man, banker and a member of the Pentarchy of 1933.

== Early history ==
Porfirio Franca was born in Havana, Cuba on July 22, 1878.

In 1902, Franca was founding member of the Vedado Tennis Club in Vedado which he presided over for 15 years.

He managed the local Havana branch of the National City Bank of New York and was director of the Banco Nacional de Cuba.

In 1923, the International Olympic Committee (IOC) elected Porfirio Franca, who held the Cuban seat until 1938. He was instrumental in staging the 1930 Central American and Caribbean Games in Havana.

== Politics ==
After Gerardo Machado was deposed on August 12, 1933, Franca declined to accept an offer as the Secretary of the Treasury under the incoming Céspedes administration. Carlos Manuel de Céspedes y Quesada served as President of Cuba from August 13 to September 1933 before an executive committee was appointed which included Porfirio Franca.

=== Pentarchy of 1933 ===
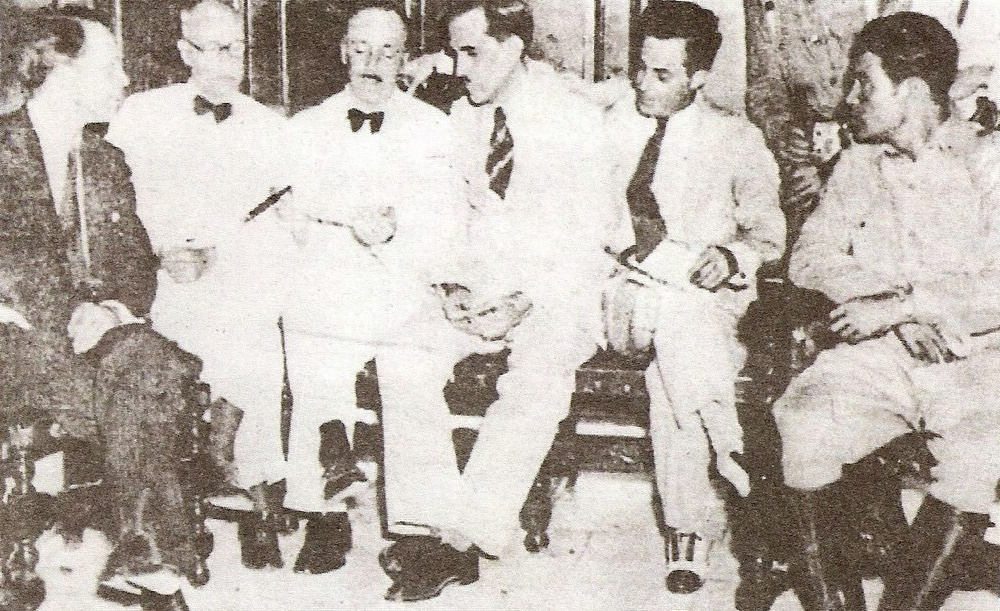
The five members of the pentarchy, from the left in the picture, Josée M. Irisari, Porfirio Franca, Guillermo Portela, Ramon Grau, and Sergio Carbó.

From September 5 to September 10, 1933, Franca acted as the Commissioner of Finance in the five-man Executive Commission of the Provisional Government of Cuba, which included José Irisarri, Guillermo Portela, Ramón Grau, and Sergio Carbó. Franca resigned his post as a commissioner after former sergeant Fulgencio Batista was named Chief of Staff of the Army, fearing an attack upon him by Batista who had led the Sargeants' Revolt. Franca agreed to serve on the executive commission until a new president was named which was Dr. Ramón Grau of the Pentarchy, on September 10, 1933.

== Death ==
Porfirio Franca y Álvarez de la Campa died on May 3, 1950.
