= Juan Blas Hernández =

Cuban military figure and murder victim

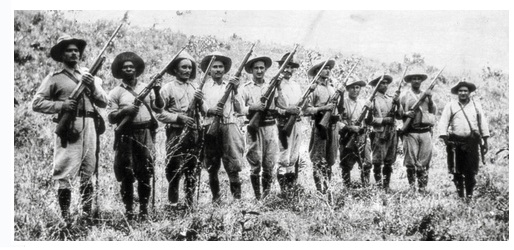

Colonel Juan Blas Hernández (January 20, 1879 – November 9, 1933) was a prominent figure in the 1933 revolt against Gerardo Machado and subsequent resistance to the One Hundred Days Government.

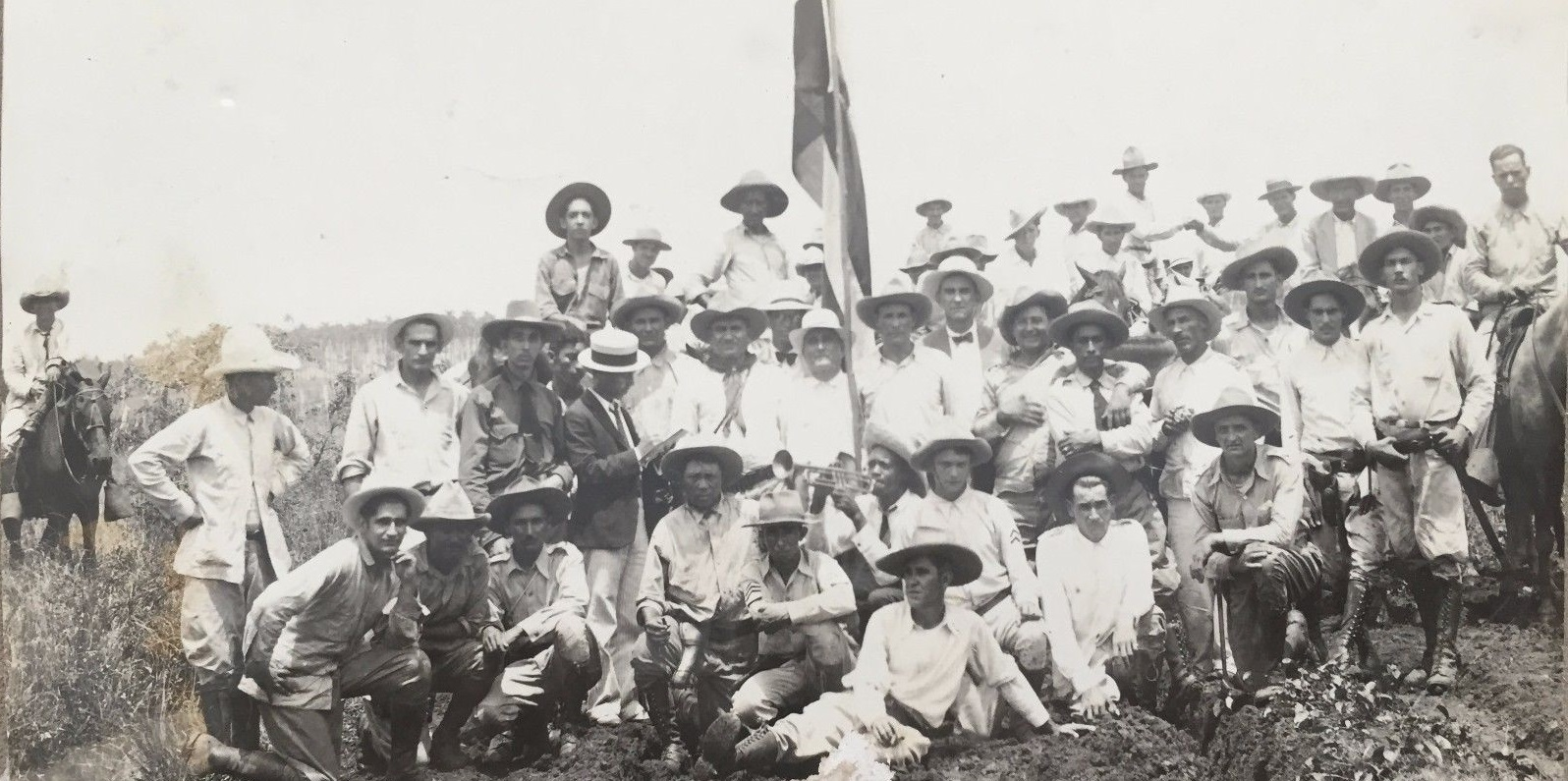
Colonel Blas Hernandez (circa 1933), middle row, second to left from flag

== Early life ==
Juan Blas Hernández, originally from Guayos and of Canarian ancestry, was born January 20, 1879. He participated in the Cuban War of Independence of the late 19th century. He eventually obtained the rank of colonel. During the increasingly-authoritarian presidency of Gerardo Machado Colonol Blas Hernández became a rural rebel and led guerilla campaigns against the Machado regime, including one campaign all the way from 1931 until the fall of the regime in 1933.

== Revolution of 1933 ==
In 1933, a number of the key figures involved in the plotting of the nascent Sergeants Revolt that eventually brought Fulgencio Batista to power approached former colonel Blas Hernández. At this meeting, the colonel, who had been operating as a bandit and peasant leader in rural areas around Havana previously, offered to provide more than 150 men for the revolt. Following the success of the revolt, he was invited to Havana by the newly-formed One Hundred Days Government of Ramón Grau and Fulgencio Batista. Batista feared Blas Hernandez would again rise up under arms, so the colonel was asked to enter Havana unarmed.

A mere two weeks after allying with the revolutionaries of 1933, Blas Hernandez rose in revolt against the new government in conjunction with other rebel leaders, such as Major Balan north of Holguin. This revolt, however, eventually died-down, and a sort of "stalemate" emerged where Cuba remained in a state of chaos but the new government managed to cling to power.

On November 8th, 1933, Colonel Blas again rose in revolt as part of the wider "November Revolt." In spite of the initial opposition of the colonel, he and other leaders of the revolt eventually vacated the Ambrosio barracks in Havana and established a stronghold at the nearby Atarés Castle.

Batista directed all of the artillery in Havana against Atarés. The Cuban naval vessels Patria and Cuba, firing from the harbor, were of particular importance to Batista's forces eventually overcoming the castle's defenses. The shelling resulted in substantial casualties among the forces of Colonel Blas Hernandez, leading to the surrender of the rebels. Batista's forces showed no mercy to the defeated rebels, despite their formal surrender and many would-be prisoners were instead mown down by machine guns or executed against a wall." Blas Hernandez, wounded in the leg, was called out by name by Captain Mario Alfonso Hernandez of Batista's forces, who executed colonel Blas Hernandez with a revolver when the colonel identified himself.

=== Political Orientation ===
As journalist Enrique Lumen wrote Blas Hernandez was not particularly political, social reforms were but shadows for the rural leader. However, he did formally associate with a few political and economic reforms, particularly rural land reform. That said, although the Colonel was known as El Sandino de Cuba, he supported land reform centered on small holdings, and was therefore an ideological enemy of committed socialists like Antonio Guiteras, who favored collective holdings. In many ways, the actions of Colonel Blas Hernandez hearkened back to a sort of traditional rural resistance which pre-dated the labor actions of the 20th century. Like so many rural "caudillo" leaders before him, Colonel Blas Hernandez was susceptible to the suggestion of those from the urban centers.

== See also ==
- Lazo, Mario 1972 El primer año de Castro. Chapter 10. Daga en el corazón. Minerva Books, New York. Printed in Barcelona Photos: Blas Hernandez with Batista page 49.

== Bibliography ==
- Aparicio Laurencio, Ángel (1994). Hernández Martín, Jorge (ed.). Blas Hernández y la Revolución de 1933: La campana en los campos de Cuba [Blas Hernández and the revolution of 1933: The campaign in the fields of Cuba]. Colección Cuba y sus Jueces (in Spanish) (1st ed.). Miami: Ediciones Universal. ISBN 0-89729-706-7.
- Argote-Freyre, Frank (2006). Fulgencio Batista: Volume 1, From Revolutionary to Strongman. New Brunswick, New Jersey: Rutgers University Press. ISBN 0-8135-3701-0.
- Macías Martín, Francisco Javier (1998). La diplomacia española ante el «Machadato» y la crisis cubana de 1933 [Spanish diplomacy toward the Machado regime and the Cuban crisis of 1933] (PDF) (Doctoral Thesis) (in Spanish). San Cristóbal de La Laguna (Islas Canarias, España): Universidad de La Laguna.
- Thomas, Hugh (1971). Cuba: The Pursuit of Freedom. New York: Da Capo Press. ISBN 9780306808272.
