= La Semana =

Cuban newspaper

- Type: Periodical
- Format: Newspaper
- Founder: Sergio Carbó
- Language: Spanish
- Headquarters: Havana
- City: Havana
- Country: Cuba
- Circulation: (as of 1925)
- OCLC number: 1053901002

La Semana was a newspaper published by Sergio Carbó in Havana, Cuba, from 1925 to 1935. The paper played a major role in Cuban politics.

== Early history ==
La Semana, a weekly satirical publication in Havana, was founded in 1925. Sergio Carbó was the founder and the editor-in-chief of the weekly political commentary journal.

In the late 1920s, it had the biggest circulation of any paper on the island of Cuba and a property valuation of $300,000.

In August 1929, La Semana was suppressed after being indicted by the Gerardo Machado Government on charges of printing obscene photos. Three of its reporters were deported under a decree signed by Machado, while the editor-in-chief Carbó fled by airplane to the United States. Carbó was also later detained in the political prison at La Cabaña Fortress in January 1931, for publishing content in the La Semana newspaper, that the government found objectionable before his eventual release in February 1931.

During the One Hundred Days Government in November 1933, there were bombings in Havana, one of which damaged the front of the newspaper offices.
