= Pentarchy (disambiguation) =

Pentarchy is a term in the history of Christianity for the idea of universal rule over all of Christendom by the heads of the five major episcopal sees of the Roman Empire.

Pentarchy may also refer to:

- A confederation of five dynasties in India controlling the Maratha Empire (1674-1818)
- The five great powers that formed the 19th-century Concert of Europe
- Pentarchy of 1933, the Executive Commission of the Provisional Government of Cuba
