= Cuban Revolution of 1933 =

Coup d'etat in Cuba in September 1933

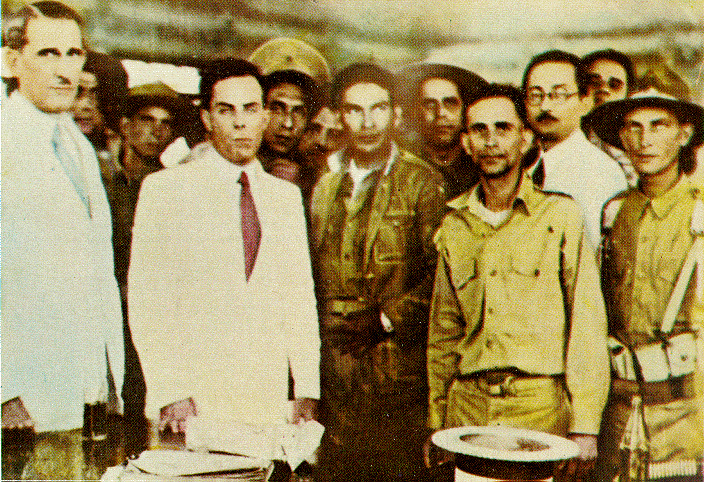
- Ramón Grau, Sergio Carbó and Sgt. Fulgencio Batista, leaders in the government formed by the coup
Date	September 4–5, 1933
Location	Havana, Pinar del Rio, Matanzas
Result	President Carlos Manuel de Céspedes y Quesada deposed, and One Hundred Days Government created.

Government-Insurgents
Government of Cuba	Cuban Military; Directorio Estudiantil Universitario

Commanders and leaders
Carlos Manuel de Céspedes y Quesada; Carlos Saladrigas Zayas	Dr. Ramón Grau; Fulgencio Batista; Manuel Benitez Valdés

The Cuban Revolution of 1933 (Spanish: Revolución cubana de 1933), also called the Sergeants' Revolt, was a coup d'etat that occurred in Cuba in September 1933. It began as a revolt of sergeants and enlisted men in the military, who soon allied with student activists in the Directorio Estudiantil Universitario. The coup deposed Carlos Manuel de Céspedes y Quesada as president, installing a new government led by a five-man coalition, known as the Pentarchy of 1933.

After only five days, the Pentarchy gave way to the presidency of Ramón Grau, whose term is known as the One Hundred Days Government. The leader of the coup, Sergeant Fulgencio Batista, became the head of the armed forces and began a long period of influence on Cuban politics.

== Background ==
=== End of Machado regime ===
The authoritarian policies of Gerardo Machado and the Great Depression beginning in 1929 plunged Cuba into an economic and social crisis, amidst which opposition groups proliferated. Pressure and demonstrations by the Directorio Estudiantil Universitario (Student Directory) and workers, as well by US Ambassador Sumner Welles, forced Machado to resign.

Carlos Manuel de Céspedes y Quesada led a provisional government that included members of the opposition group ABC in its cabinet. Other groups from the Machado opposition were unsatisfied with the provisional government, which to them represented an unacceptable compromise with US interventionism. On August 24, the Student Directory issued a Manifesto-Program that denounced the ABC and made various demands, including the formation of a new government.

=== Military ===
After the fall of Machado, the military perceived its situation as precarious. Opposition forces controlled Havana, and took their revenge on supporters of the Machado regime, including police and some soldiers. The military was reluctant to intervene in this situation lest the public perceive it as an agent of the old regime. Arrest of 50 soldiers and 21 officers did not satisfy demands for reform.

Critics of the Céspedes government, including within the military, charged that it was not taking sufficient action against Machado's backers within the military, and that it had failed to reinstate officers who had opposed Machado. This situation exacerbated longstanding tension (related to age, class, and race) between the ranks of officers.

== Conspiracy ==
Flag used by the revolutionaries

A group of sergeants began meeting at the Columbia barracks, forming the Columbia Military Union. Their ambition to improve conditions in the army quickly expanded to a plan for regime change. This group, later called the Junta of the Eight (despite uncertainty about numbers) included Batista and other members of his ABC cell, as well as Pablo Rodríguez, whom some perceived to be the group's leader, and Jaime Mariné.

A funeral for Sergeant Miguel Ángel Hernández y Rodríguez, captured and killed by the Machado government in May 1933, took place on 19 August 1933. This gave Batista the opportunity to do a passionate oration which brought him attention as a future leader. At the funeral he met with journalist Sergio Carbó, who acted as an important contact for him in the civilian world.

In August the group of sergeants created a manifesto calling for dignity, respect, and benefits for soldiers, and declaring the duty of soldiers to rebel. Batista asked the ABC, to which he belonged, to publicize the manifesto. The ABC, which had established itself as part of the status quo government, refused, and Batista and others left the group.

Other factions within the military were also plotting against the Céspedes government, and some spoke openly against it.

As the movement grew, the plotters met in larger venues, including the masonic Gran Logia de Cuba and a military hospital. These preparations became somewhat obvious, but meetings continued to occur on the pretext of planning projects to improve quality of life for enlisted men. The action mostly took place in Havana, with some outreach to Matanzas Province soon before the coup.

== Coup ==
We had gained a great deal of confidence; we were on the point of overthrowing Céspedes; and this movement at Camp Columbia might be the vehicle for that overthrow. These circumstances prompted us to get moving. We set out for Columbia to see what was going on, to figure out what we should do, and to see what we could accomplish.
When we left for Columbia, we did not even remotely consider — in spite of the psychological determinism that will soon become evident — that the sergeants would constitute the ultimate solution to the military conflict Machado had left behind. Perhaps — we felt more or less subconsciously — this might be an opportunity to bring down the Plattist regime Ambassador Welles had imposed and, after a very brief intermediate step, we might achieve an easy formula of happy adjustment to the apparatus of the state.

— Student activist Justo Carrillo

On September 3 and 4 some of the lower-ranking officers at Columbia barracks directly raised issues of back pay and promotions with the senior officers. On September 4, Captain Mario Torres Menier appeared at a meeting of the enlisted men at Camp Columbia. Batista allowed him to enter. The soldiers made their complaints with mounting enthusiasm; Torres Menier withdrew to consult with other superior officers. Another meeting was scheduled for 8PM. In the interim, leaders of the coup rallied their supporters. Batista contacted Carbó and secured the support of Juan Blas Hernández, a rebel who opposed Machado for two years.

The meeting that evening took place in a theater. The senior officers had been excluded. Batista spoke from onstage, declaring:

From this moment forward, do not obey anyone's orders but mine. First sergeants must immediately take control of their respective military units. If there is no first sergeant, or if he refuses to take command, the senior sergeant must do so. If there is no sergeant, a corporal. If there is no willing corporal, then a soldier, and if not, then a recruit. The units must have someone in command and he must be an enlisted man.

Thus the sergeants took uncontested control of Columbia barracks and soon established communications with sympathetic officers in other cities. Members of the Student Directory—beginning with José Leyva, Ramiro Valdés Daussá, Juan António Rubio Padilla, Carlos Prío Socarrás, Rubén de León, and Justo Carrillo—came to the barracks and joined forces with the army. While President Céspedes was away from Havana to survey hurricane damage, the rebels forced the remaining government officers in Havana to leave their posts. They then issued a proclamation announcing that they were in control of the country, and set up a Pentarchy modeled on the then-current government of Uruguay.

After President Céspedes returned on September 5, members of the junta arrived at his office and informed him that they were to receive the government from him. Swayed by their claim to command the allegiance of the military rank and file, Céspedes vacated the Presidential Palace.

The coup tested the new Franklin D. Roosevelt administration's Good Neighbor Policy, with some in the administration wanting full-scale military intervention in Cuba while Roosevelt wanted to avoid it.

== Junta ==
The junta of officers and students proclaimed that it had taken power in order to fulfill the aims of the revolution; it briefly described a program which included economic restructuring, punishment of wrongdoers, recognition of public debts, creation of courts, political reorganization, and any other actions necessary to construct a new Cuba based on justice and democracy.

Both Grau and Batista visited Welles on September 5 to seek support from the US and ascertain its position.

Only five days after the coup, the Student Directory promoted Ramón Grau, one of the members of the Pentarchy, to the role of President, replacing the Pentarchy.

The coup displaced 900 officers from command. Of these, 200 rejoined the armed forces under Batista; 300 went into retirement, exile, or prison; and 400 gathered at the Hotel Nacional, to await a return to power. The sergeants consolidated their power over the military at the Battle of the Hotel Nacional, in which the higher-ranking officers were eliminated. Batista, having pushed Rodríguez out of power, emerged as the foremost leader.

The ensuing One Hundred Days Government issued a number of reformist declarations but never gained diplomatic recognition from the US; it was overthrown in January 1934 under pressure from Batista and the US.

== See also ==
- History of Cuba
- Timeline of Cuban history
