= Guillermo Portela =

Cuban Commissioner of Foreign Affairs (1886–1958)

Dr. Guillermo Portela y Möller

Minister of Justice Commissioner of Foreign Affairs
- In office September 5, 1933 – September 10, 1933
- Constituency: Republic of Cuba

Personal details
- Born: Guillermo F. Portela y Möller; November 1, 1886 La Habana, Cuba
- Died: March 2, 1958 (aged 71)
- Children: 2

Guillermo Portela (November 1, 1886 – March 2, 1958) was a Cuban lawyer, law professor, and member of the Pentarchy of 1933.

== Early life ==
Guillermo Portela y Möller was born in La Habana, Cuba.

He was the head of a law firm in Havana and a professor of criminal law at the University of Havana.

== Politics ==
In the early 1930s, Portela spent two years in prison for defending student opponents of deposed President Gerardo Machado.

He was hospitalized for two months following his release. The university professor sought recovery in Hendersonville, North Carolina, during the winter of 1932 and stayed there for five months and a few weeks during the summer. With the fall of the Machado regime in 1933, he made his way back to Cuba.

== Pentarchy of 1933 ==
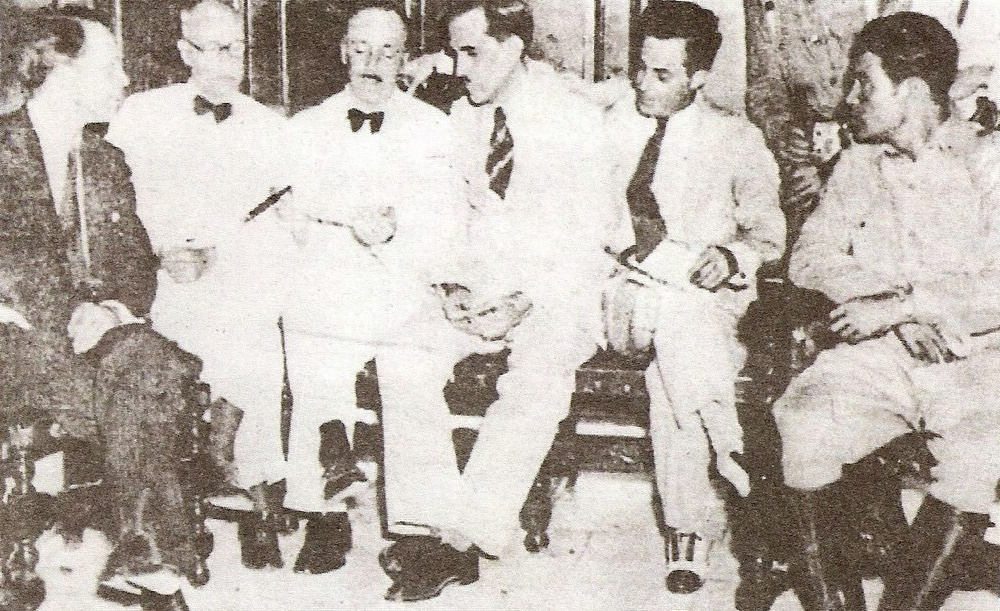
The five members of the pentarchy, from the left in the picture, Josée M. Irisari, Porfirio Franca, Guillermo Portela, Ramon Grau, and Sergio Carbó.

As one of the five members of the Executive Commission of the Provisional Government of Cuba appointed on September 5, 1933, Portela served alongside José Irisarri, Porfirio Franca, Ramón Grau, and Sergio Carbó. The position of Minister of Justice was given to Portela. Despite not having any more authority than the other members of the committee, he was the only one with a unique responsibility—handling foreign affairs. On September 10, 1933, Dr. Ramón Grau was later named Cuban President by the military junta. Portela was not included in the new cabinet as he resigned his post as a commissioner but agreed to serve until a president was named. Guillermo Portela was acting as intermediary between the students and the leaders of the political parties in October 1933.

In 1937, Portela founded the Orquesta Casino de la Playa in Havana, one of the first Cuban jazz bands.

== Death ==
Guillermo Portela y Möller died on March 2, 1958.
