= Prensa Libre (Cuba) =

Cuban newspaper

Prensa Libre was a newspaper published by Sergio Carbó in Havana, Cuba, from 1941 to 1960.

Prensa Libre, a daily publication in Havana, was the largest daily newspaper in Cuba.

The newspaper was occupied and confiscated on May 16, 1960, by the Cuban government. Co-editors Ulises Carbó and Humberto Medrano, as well as Sergio Carbó, went into exile after the Prensa Libre was seized.

== Honors and awards ==
- IAPA-Mergenthaler Award. (1959)

== Other publications ==
When Prensa Libre wrote critically about the suppression of Diario de la Marina and the imminent loss of freedom of the press in Cuba, it too was seized by the government. Revolutionary mobs, incited by the frenzy of the moment, calling for execution of all the editors who opposed Castro and his Revolution. One by one, Cuban newspapers ceased publication. Only government-controlled publications, like Revolución, El Mundo, Bohemia, and the communist Hoy were allowed to publish but even they were eventually phased out. After the firm establishment of the regime and the supremacy of the Communist Party, only Granma the official organ of the Cuban Communist Party, was allowed to exist.
