= Alberto Herrera Franchi =

Cuban officer and politician (1874–1954)

General Alberto Herrera
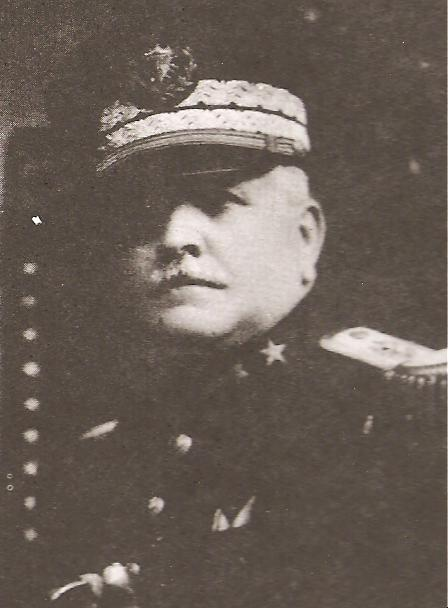

President of Cuba Interim
- In office 12 August 1933 – 13 August 1933
- Preceded by: Gerardo Machado
- Succeeded by: Carlos Manuel de Céspedes y Quesada

Personal details
- Born: September 1, 1874 Santa Clara, Spanish Cuba
- Died: March 18, 1954 (aged 79) Havana, Republic of Cuba
- Party: Liberal Party of Cuba
- Spouse: Ofelia Rodríguez Arango
- Occupation: Military officer

General Alberto Herrera y Franchi (September 1, 1874 – March 18, 1954) was the interim President of Cuba from August 12 to August 13, 1933.

== Biography ==
He was married to Ofelia Rodríguez Arango and they had three children, Alberto, Rodolfo and Ofelia Herrera Rodríguez.

In 1903 Herrera was appointed a Captain of the Rural Guard. He was later assigned to the permeant Army in 1909, and promoted the rank of Major. He was then transferred to the Infantry in 1910 and was promoted to Lieutenant-Colonel in 1913. Eventually assigned to the General Staff in 1915, he was promoted to Colonel in 1917 and assigned Chief of a Military District. In 1922 he was appointed by President Alfredo Zayas as interim Chief of Staff, replacing General Armando Montes, who had accepted the position of Secretary of War and Navy.

General Herrera was also the Secretary of War & Navy during the presidency of Gerardo Machado.

== Role in Machado's administration and the 1933 Revolution ==
On August 11, 1933, when Cuban National Army rebels took hold of the Castillo de la Real Fuerza, General Herrera attended the fortress in order to reach a resolution or pact with the rebels. He met with Erasmo Delgado. After much debate and given that the rebels did not want Herrera to secure the presidency after Machado’s departure, it was agreed that given his powers as General the actions committed by the rebels did not constitute a revolt but were ordered on his behalf.

== After Machado’s departure ==
After the departure of Machado on August 12, 1933, a power vacuum was created and Sumner Welles initially proposed the replacement of Machado with Herrera, but the army rebels did not agree with this proposal. Welles noted on August 12, 1933:

"After the promise of certain of the Army leaders at 4 o'clock this morning that they would agree to the ad interim Presidency of any Cuban provided President Machado would retire from the office. I was advised at 7 that they had again changed their minds and would accept anyone other than General Herrera to whom they were personally devoted but whom they feared the great mass of the opposition would not accept on account of his past intimate connection with President Machado."

As a result, Sumner Welles devised a new plan in which Herrera would remain the only Cabinet member who would not resign from Machado's administration thus by default becoming the interim President solely for the purpose of appointing Carlos Manuel de Céspedes y Quesada, the son of Carlos Manuel de Céspedes (Father of the Country), as member of Herrera's Cabinet. Immediately thereafter, Herrera would resign and as Carlos Manuel de Céspedes y Quesada would be the only one left in the Cabinet, he would by default become the new President. Welles' intention was to keep a form of constitutional continuance between the departure of Machado and the installation of a new government. Some scholars, such as Rolando Rodriguez, have questioned whether the appointment of Carlos Manuel de Céspedes y Quesada as a Cabinet member followed by his appointment as President thereafter was constitutional at all. After the appointment of Carlos Manuel de Cespedes y Quesada as President, Herrera fled to the Hotel Nacional and later secured passage to flee Cuba.
