= Pentarchy of 1933 =

Five-person coalition that ruled Cuba

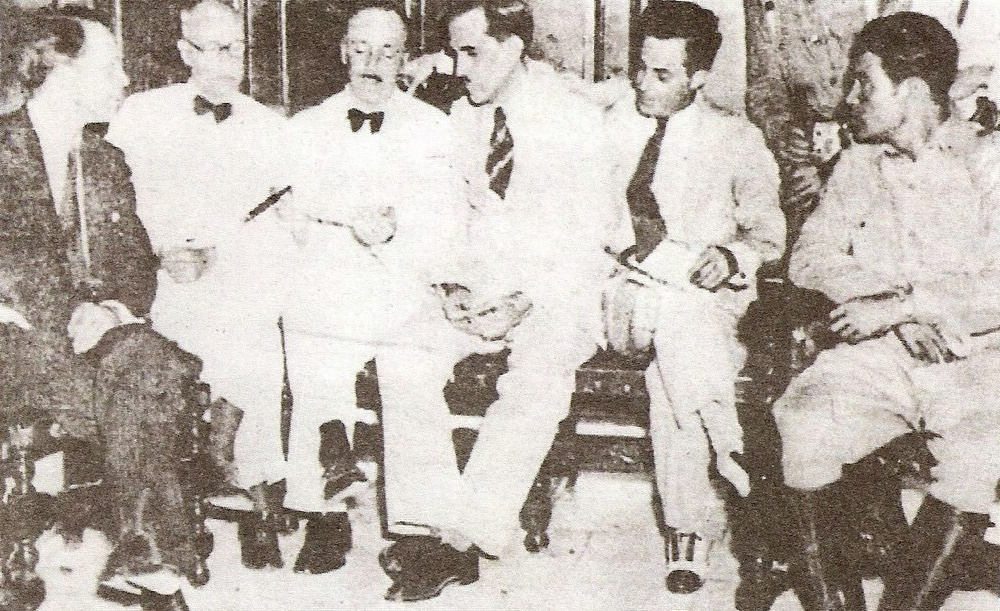
- José M. Irisari, Porfirio Franca, Guillermo Portela, Ramon Grau, and Sergio Carbó “The Pentarchy” with Fulgencio Batista taken in 1933

Executive Commission of the Provisional Government of Cuba
- In office 5 September 1933 – 10 September 1933
- Preceded by: Carlos Manuel de Céspedes y Quesada (as Provisional President)
- Succeeded by: Ramon Grau (as President)

Pentarchy of 1933, formally known as the Executive Commission of the Provisional Government of Cuba, was a coalition that ruled Cuba from September 5 to September 10, 1933 after Gerardo Machado was deposed on August 12, 1933. Prior to the Pentarchy, General Alberto Herrera (August 12–13, 1933) and Carlos Manuel de Céspedes y Quesada (August 13 - September 5, 1933) served as President of Cuba.

The members of the Pentarchy were:

- Sergio Carbó y Morera (1891–1971), journalist
- Porfirio Franca y Álvarez de la Campa (1878–1950), attorney, banker and economist
- Ramón Grau San Martín (1887–1969), faculty member at the University of Havana School of Medicine
- José Miguel Irisarri y Gamio (1895–1968), an attorney
- Guillermo Portela y Möller (1886–1958), faculty member at the University of Havana School of Law

The first thing the Pentarchy did was to draft a proclamation which was written by Sergio Carbó and signed by eighteen civilians and one military man, Fulgencio Batista. That proclamation was published in every Cuban newspaper the following day. Carbó later promoted Batista from sergeant to colonel without notifying the other four. Later they were ousted by the Student Directory and Ramón Grau was named president.

== Attempts to overthrow the Pentarchy ==
U.S. ambassador to Cuba Sumner Welles noted in a telegram to the Secretary of State that late at night on September 6, 1933, Dr. Horacio Ferrer, Secretary of War in the Carlos Manuel de Céspedes y Quesada Cabinet, called to see him. He advised the ambassador that he was in contact with sergeants in control of the Fortress La Cabaña who advised Ferrer that they were deceived in participating in the mutiny and that they were prepared to make any reparation for their action. Ferrer's plan would be as follows, after taking some preliminary measures, Ferrer, accompanied with 80 loyal officers would proceed on September 8, 1933 to the Fortress La Cabaña with President Cespedes and several other members of his Cabinet and that on early morning September 9, 1933, Ferrer would proclaim the support of the Fortress to the legitimate Government of President Cespedes. Ferrer would then ask the ambassador whether “should this action be taken, and should Cespedes Government make such request the Government of the United States would be willing to land troops from the battleships now due to arrive at Cojimar immediately to the east of Cabaña Fortress, in order to assist the Cespedes Government in maintaining order.”

Sumner Welles himself supported Ferrer and advised Washington of the following: "What I propose would be a strictly limited intervention of the following nature...entail the landing of a consider force at Havana and lesser forces in certain of the more important ports of the Republic."`

The Franklin Delano Roosevelt administration was reluctant, however, to any form of direct military intervention as noted in the following telegram in response to Sumner Welles's telegram proposing the "limited intervention." The Secretary of State, Cordell Hull on September 7, 1933 at 8pm noted as follows to Sumner Welles, "Your 206 September 6, noon. We fully appreciate the various viewpoints set forth in your telegram. However, after mature consideration, the President has decided to send you the following message:

"We feel very strongly that any promise, implied or otherwise, relating to what the United States will do under any circumstances is impossible; that it would be regarded as a breach of neutrality, as favoring one faction out of many, as attempting to set up a government which would be regarded by the whole world, and especially throughout Latin America, as a creation and creature of the American government...strict neutrality is of the essence."

In addition to Dr. Ferrer's attempt to overthrow the new revolutionary government, there was also the Cuban Army on behalf of Batista seeking to make back-deals with Cespedes. As reported by Sumner Welles to the U.S. Secretary of State on September 9, 1933, " A commission of sergeants visited [former] President Carlos Manuel de Cespedes y Quesada this morning in his house to inform him that Colonel, former Sergeant, Fulgencio Batista was willing to support his restoration to the Presidency provided President Cespedes would confirm him in his position as Colonel and Chief of Staff of the Army and guarantee his safety and that of his associates in this mutiny. President Cespedes stated that he was unwilling to make any commitments whatever as to what would be done provided he was reinstated in power."
