= Antonio Guiteras =

Cuban politician

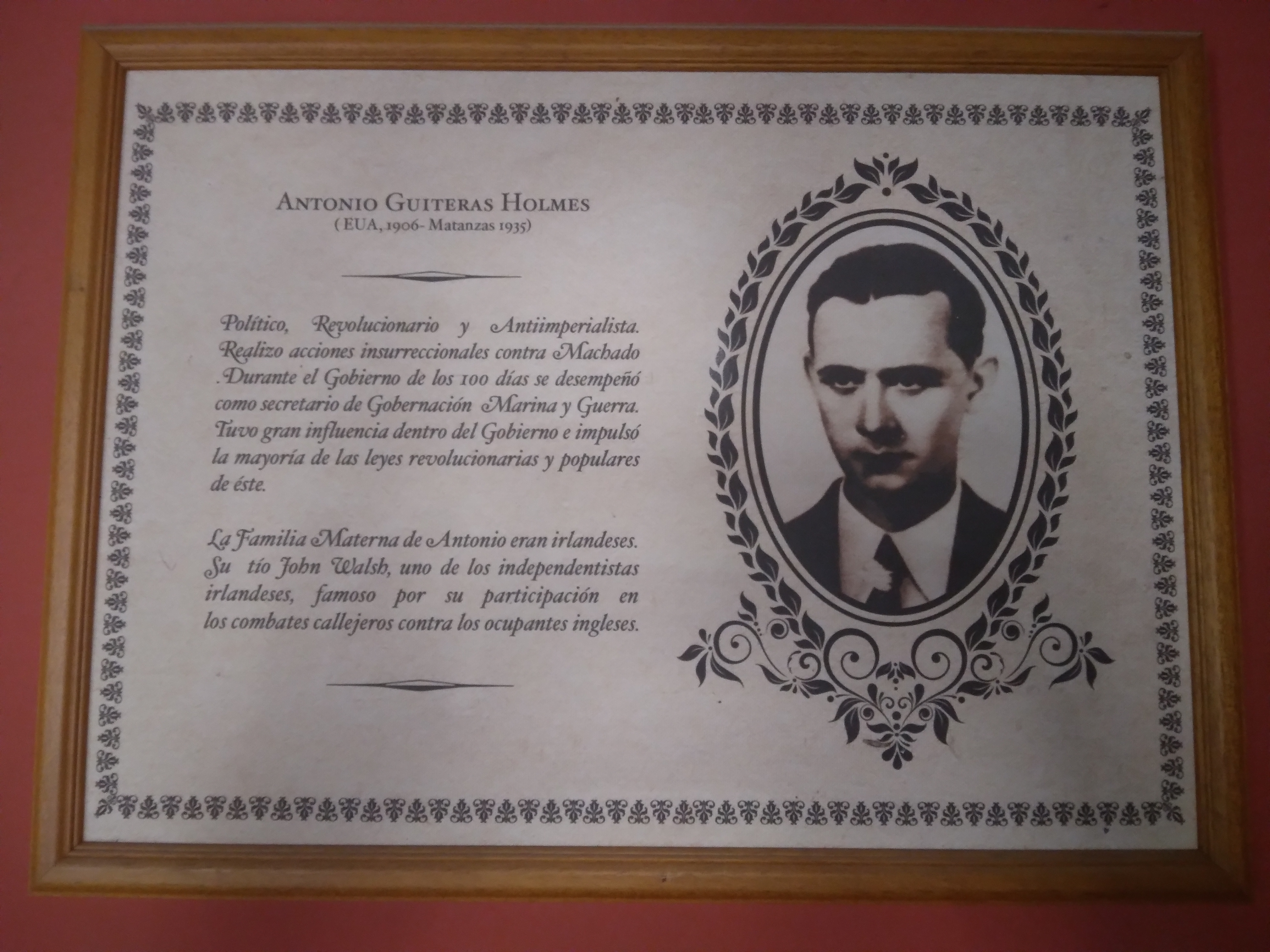
- A plaque to Guiteras on the wall of Café O'Reilly in Havana, celebrating Cubans of Irish lineage
- Born: Antonio Guiteras y Holmes; 22 November 1906; Bala Cynwyd, Pennsylvania, USA
- Died: 8 May 1935 (aged 28); Matanzas, Cuba
- Occupation: politician
- Known for: Revolutionary socialism
- Notable work: established the Unión Revolucionaria

Antonio Guiteras y Holmes (22 November 1906 – 8 May 1935) was a leading politician in Cuba during the 1930s.

== Biography ==
He was born 22 November 1906 in Bala Cynwyd, Pennsylvania, USA. He was a proponent of revolutionary socialism and participated in the radical government installed after the overthrow of the autocratic right wing Cuban President Gerardo Machado y Morales in 1933. In 1932, Guiteras established the Unión Revolucionaria.

Guiteras's political beliefs were nurtured in the volatile political climate of the 1920s. He first became widely known as a student leader and associate of Julio Antonio Mella, a young Communist revolutionary. He believed that the liberation of the people would be achieved through violent confrontation with the established authorities; he did not hold firm to the ideal of democracy. Antonio Guiteras was named Minister of the Interior under President Dr. Ramón Grau San Martín. Many reforms were introduced, including a minimum wage, minimum labour regulations, academic freedom, and nationalisation of important sectors of the economy. After the "government of 100 days", Guiteras became even more radical and founded Joven Cuba, a proletarian political organisation inspired by anti-capitalism and the nationalism of José Martí.

In his account Cuba: A New History, the leftist historian Richard Gott summarizes Guiteras's beliefs and methods:

Guiteras's views reflected an eclectic mix of revolutionary influences, from Auguste Blanqui to Jean Jacques Jaurès. He drew inspiration from the Mexican and the Russian revolutions, the struggle in Ireland and Sandino's guerrilla movement in Nicaragua. He shared the anti-imperialist politics of the age and, drawing on anarchist roots, advocated rural and urban armed struggle, assaults on army barracks and the assassination of policemen and members of the government. He was a firm believer in direct action, the propaganda of the deed, derived from Blanqui and the Spanish anarchists, and was much criticised by the Communists for his voluntarism and his predilection for violence.

He died in Matanzas, Cuba: Guiteras and several of his conspirators died in a gun battle with Batista's army on May 8, 1935, at the abandoned Spanish Fort Morrillo in the Valley of Matanzas. Guiteras was waiting there for a boat that was to take him and his companions across to México, where he hoped to continue his work for the people of Cuba.
