= Directorio Estudiantil Universitario =

University of Havana student group

The Directorio Estudiantil Universitario (DEU; English: University Student Directory) was founded in 1927 by University of Havana students against the backdrop of a power grab by President Gerardo Machado consisting of constitutional reforms designed to prolong his presidential term by two years, and to promote his reelection to an additional term of six years. In the period between pushing for these reforms and their adoption by the corrupt Constitutional Assembly, a strong opposition composed chiefly of university students formed against this "Machadato" (Machado + mandato, mandate).

The DEU held various protests against Machado's regime and was at the political forefront of the One Hundred Days Government led by Ramón Grau. The group dissolved itself on November 6, 1933.

== Background ==
Student activism flourished in the 1920s. In 1922–1923, students formed an organization called the Federación Estudiantil Universitaria (FEU; University Student Federation) which addressed political as well as scholastic issues and took a stance against American imperialism. After the election of Machado in 1924 some of the gains in student power were reversed, and non-educational student organizations, including the FEU, were banned. The Student Directory formed in this context as an assembly of the leaders of existing athletic and cultural organizations.

== Opposition to Machado ==
Some of the group's first leaders were expelled from school but new ones arose and the group became a vanguard of opposition to Machado. The assassination of exiled former FEU leader Julio Antonio Mella in 1929 further exacerbated the tension with Machado which arose when he announced the extension of his term. The student manifesto called Machado a "human beast, a Nero or Caligula."

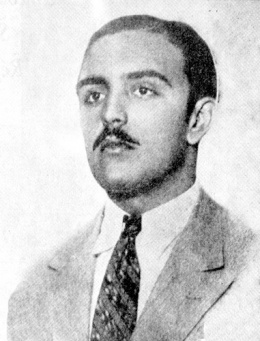
Rafael Trejo González became a martyr of the student movement.

Confrontations between government and opposition became violent in 1930. The DEU planned to disrupt the opening ceremony at the university but were thwarted by a police informant in their ranks who gave away the plan. On September 30, 1930, the scheduled beginning of classes, police were guarding the university, and the students began a march outside. Some arrests and injuries occurred, and the student Rafael Trejo González (es) died in the hospital from his injuries.

The protest and the death of Trejo brought the students to the forefront of the national political scene. The government accused them of being Communist subversives, which perhaps some of them were, and announced its intention to act against them unhesitatingly. Civil society groups, politicians, editorialists, and others expressed their support for the students. On October 29 the students published a political program calling for transformation of the University of Havana and of Cuban society as a whole. Their demands included an investigation into the September 30 events, the resignation of education secretary Octavio Averhoff y Pla and of University Rector Dr. Ricardo Martínez Pietro, demilitarization of educational centers, reinstatement of students expelled in 1927, and autonomy for the university.

In November all schools were closed, free speech was officially suppressed, and the army patrolled the streets. The government had acquiesced to the request for autonomy at the university and the resignation of Rector Martínez Pietro. However, after the students further demanded that Machado resign, the government ordered the entire membership of the DEU to be arrested on January 4, 1931. They spent much of their prison time reading and discussing politics; by the time they were released in March, some of the more radical students had formed a splinter group called Ala Izquierda Estudiantil (AIE; Student Left Wing). While the AIE took a left-wing stance, hoping for an alliance with the peasantry and the proletariat, the Student Directory placed less emphasis on class division, focusing on the abuses of Machado and the injustice of American imperialism under the Platt Amendment.

The schools remained closed for three years, while the students adapted their tactics, holding surprise protests called tánganas. The group also evolved ideologically, influenced by authors such as José Ingenieros, José Enrique Rodó, José Vasconcelos, José Marti, Enrique José Varona, Giner de los Ríos, Miguel de Unamuno, and José Ortega y Gasset. Political events abroad also influenced the group—especially the New Deal underway in the United States and the Communist and Fascist movements in Europe, including the Republic ideologies coming to the forefront in Spain.

== Revolution of 1933 ==
No, Mr. Sumner Welles, Cuban students don’t sell their souls to the Devil: they don’t want the mediation. We have begun a duel to the death which cannot be stopped at the first drop of blood. . . . The American State Department has never “mediated” in any nation to truly protect the rights of men. . . . Forget about us, Mr. Welles, and organize your mediation without us, the youth, for we are not willing to be accomplices in a pact with crime.

— Student newspaper Alma Mater, June 1933, quoted by Julio César Fernández, En defensa de la revolución (1936).

The struggle against Machado continued, with other groups including the ABC and the Cuban Communist Party also participating in the opposition, and sometimes overlapping with the students if not cooperating with each other. A turning point came in May 1933, when newly arrived American ambassador Sumner Welles was invited to mediate with selected opposition groups and the Machado regime. The Student Directory refused to participate in the American mediation, while the ABC and some smaller groups accepted the invitation.

After the Machado government was replaced with an American-backed coalition, including the ABC and headed by Carlos Manuel de Céspedes y Quesada, on August 12, 1933, Welles expressed his surprise and frustration at the students and workers flooding into the streets as if to take control of the country: "They are taking the attitude that a triumphant revolution has placed the Government in power and that they are consequently entitled to dictate the policies of the Government".

The students promulgated another statement of their platform on August 24, calling for agrarian reform, nationalization of sugar and mining, a national banking system, reform of the foreign debt, and tax reform, as well as abrogation of the Platt Amendment and autonomy for the University of Havana. They envisioned a government selected by the Student Directory and the abolition of all groups implicated in the Machadato. All citizens, including women, would have the right to vote from age 18.

On September 4, 1933, when lower-ranking officers and enlisted men successfully took over Columbia barracks, the student leaders met with them and together agreed on a plan to form a new government. Together the students and soldiers appointed a governing Pentarchy which included two professors.

After five days the Pentarchy gave way to the leadership of one of its members, Professor Ramón Grau San Martín. The Directory had to intervene to stop the selection of Gustavo Cuervo Rubio, an ally of conservative Mario García Menocal. They unilaterally selected Grau and his cabinet, which prominently included Dr. Antonio Guiteras Holmes.

The "One Hundred Days Government" which followed made numerous reformist decrees. The United States refused to recognize the legitimacy of this government. Internally, the ideological differences between the students and the military soon became apparent. The discovery of a plot by Batista to seize power led to a failed plan to assassinate him on November 3, forcing the Student Directory to confront the issue of whether they could continue to work with Batista. Unable to reach a decision, the Directory dissolved itself on November 6, 1933.

In January, the military, under the leadership of Fulgencio Batista, deposed Grau and installed a new government which the United States recognized immediately.

== Prominent members ==
Prominent members of the Student Directory included: Carlos Prio Socarras, Pablo de la Torriente Brau, Salvador Vilaseca Forné, José Lezama Lima, Justo Carrillo, Guillermo Barrientos Schweyer, Pepelín Leyva, Juan Marinello, Aureliano Sanchez Arango, Raul Roa Garcia, Antonio Díaz Baldaquín, Eduardo Chibas, and Rafael Trejo Gonzalez.

These students were young and mostly middle-class. They became known as the "Generation of 1930" and gained respect as idealistic reformers.

== See also ==
- History of Cuba
- Timeline of Cuban history
