= One Hundred Days Government =

1933–1934 Cuban government of Ramón Grau

- Gobierno de los Cien Días
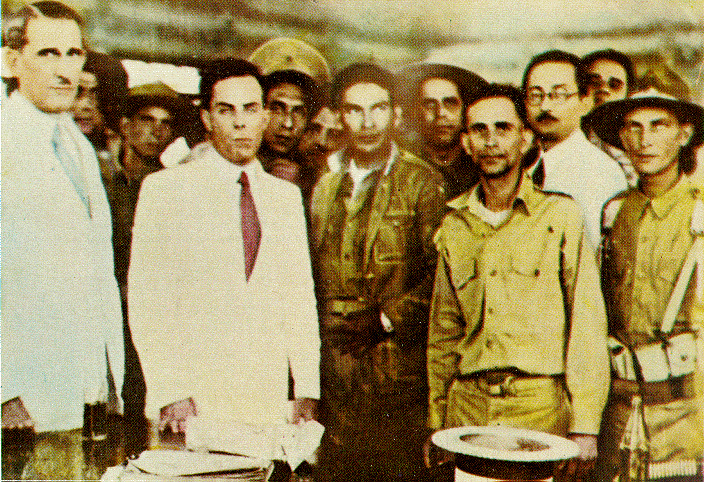
- Ramón Grau, Sergio Carbó and Fulgencio Batista
- Formation: 10 September 1933
- Extinction: 15 January 1934
- Jurisdiction: Cuba

Executive branch
- President: President of Cuba

The One Hundred Days Government (Spanish: Gobierno de los Cien Días) is the name normally used in Cuba to refer to the Cuban government of Ramon Grau which lasted from 10 September 1933 until 15 January 1934.

== Background ==
Leading up to this period, there were numerous public political pressure activities culminating with a general strike in reaction to the demagoguery and repression of Gerardo Machado's government which ended in its overthrow.

== The One Hundred days ==
=== Beginnings ===
Following the Sergeants' Revolt on 4 September 1933, a de facto military government took shape formed by unofficial sergeants, corporals and other soldiers and aided by student activists in the Directorio Estudiantil Universitario. After a brief period of collegial government called the Pentarchy of 1933 formed by five officials that lasted only five days, a new government was formed on 10 September with Ramón Grau chosen as president at the request of the university students. The new heterogeneous government incorporated three political factions: Antonio Guiteras represented the revolutionary left wing, Fulgencio Batista was the head of the traditionalist right wing, and Ramón Grau was the bridge between the two and representative of the national reform wing.

=== Social and political measures ===
The new government promoted important democratic measures for the Cuban people, which Grau and Batista would interpret as imposed by Guiteras. Batista played the self-appointed role of Colonel-in-chief of all the Armed Forces of Cuba, and repeatedly disagreed with Guiteras's decisions, many of which went against the Cuban oligarchy and imperialism, and as such affected the interests of many U.S. companies.

Various measures were taken, such as the establishment of the Secretariat as a Ministry of Labor, the establishment of a minimum wage, the 8-hour work day, the cleanup of state institutions, the nationalization of labor and ensuring that half the jobs were carried out by those born in Cuba, price cuts for everyday necessities, reductions in electrical rates, autonomy in the universities, and the intervention of the Cuban Company of Electricity (which was a subsidiary of the American company Electric Bond & Share), realized personally by Guiteras as Secretary of Interior and War via Decree 172.

These measures were not fully implemented because of the brief duration of the government. Reformists were accepted by the administration for the first time in Cuba, which made it possible for Guiteras to carry out his struggle for the general welfare of Cuban society more directly than before.

Nevertheless, internal disagreements in the government, and the lack of experience on the part of the labor movement and the masses in their struggle to achieve their objectives, hindered their effectiveness in achieving it.

=== End and transition ===
Grau's One Hundred Days Government lasted until 15 January 1934, when Grau was forced to resign by Batista, who had been conspiring with U.S. ambassador Jefferson Caffery. Grau was replaced by Carlos Mendieta, and within five days the U.S. recognized Cuba's new government.

== See also ==
- Cuba–United States relations
- History of Cuba
- Timeline of Cuban history
