= Carlos Manuel de Céspedes y Quesada =

6th President of Cuba in 1933 (1871–1939)

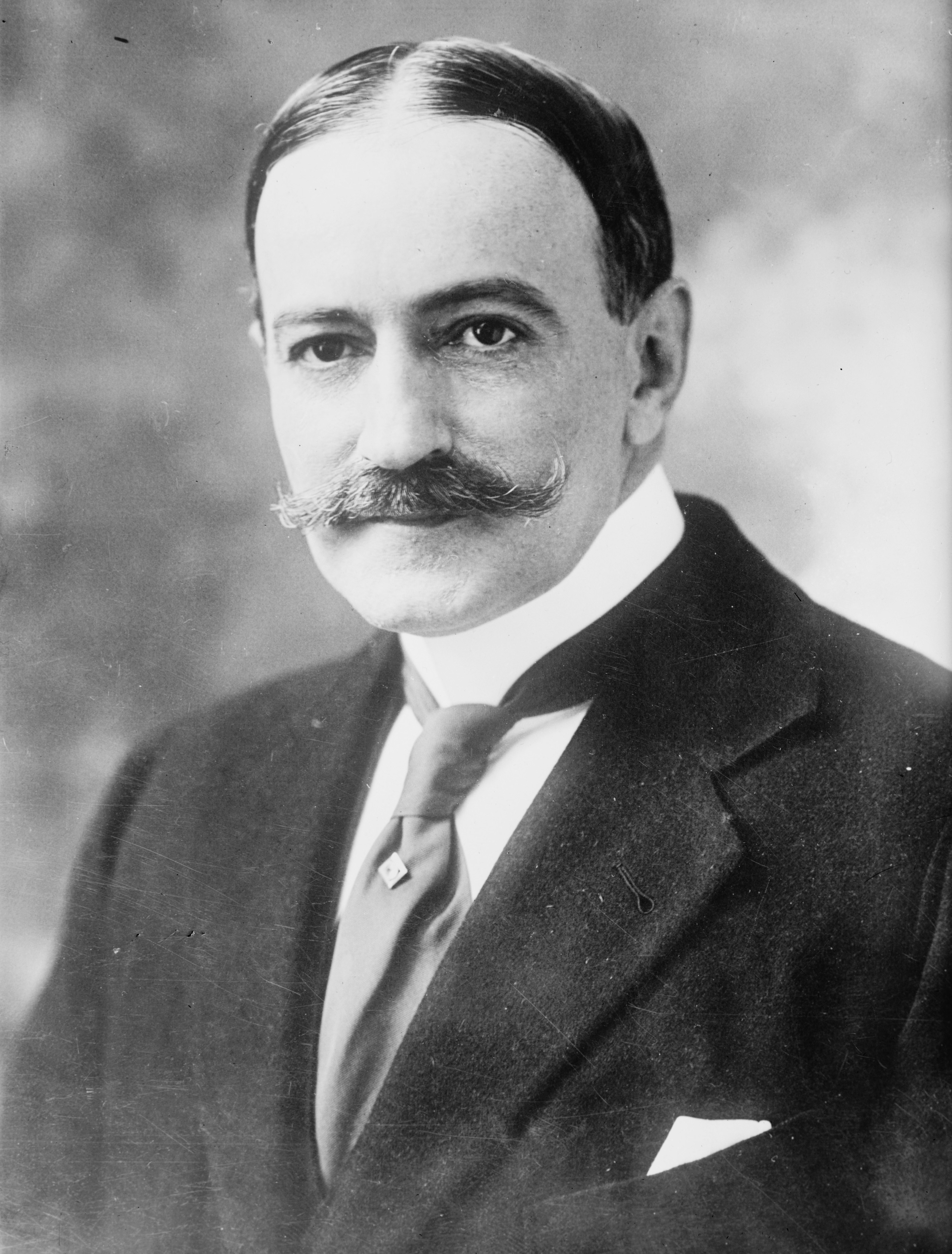
- Céspedes y Quesada circa 1914 as ambassador to the United States

6th President of Cuba
- In office 13 August 1933 – 4 September 1933
- Vice President: None
- Preceded by: Alberto Herrera Franchi
- Succeeded by: Pentarchy of 1933

Personal details
- Born: August 12, 1871 New York City, US
- Died: March 28, 1939 (aged 67) Vedado, Havana, Cuba
- Party: Liberal Party of Cuba
- Spouse: Laura Bertini y Alessandri
- Children: Carlos Manuel and Alba de Céspedes

Carlos Manuel de Céspedes y Quesada (August 12, 1871 – March 28, 1939) was a Cuban writer, politician, diplomat, and President of Cuba.

== Early life and career ==
De Céspedes was the son of Cuban revolutionary hero Carlos Manuel de Céspedes and Ana de Quesada y Loynaz, born as a twin with his sister Gloria Dolores. The younger de Céspedes was also a distant cousin of Perucho Figueredo. In 1915, he married Laura Bertini y Alessandri, an Italian, first in Rome and then later again at City Hall in New York City by Mayor John Purroy Mitchel. They had one daughter together, Alba de Céspedes.

He was educated first in New York City until 1885, when his mother took him and his twin sister to Germany. He later earned degrees in international law and diplomacy from the Collège Stanislas in Paris, France.

In 1895, he returned to Cuba and from 1895 to 1898 he fought in the War of Independence, becoming a teniente coronel (lieutenant colonel) and the revolutionary post of governor of the Province of Santiago de Cuba.

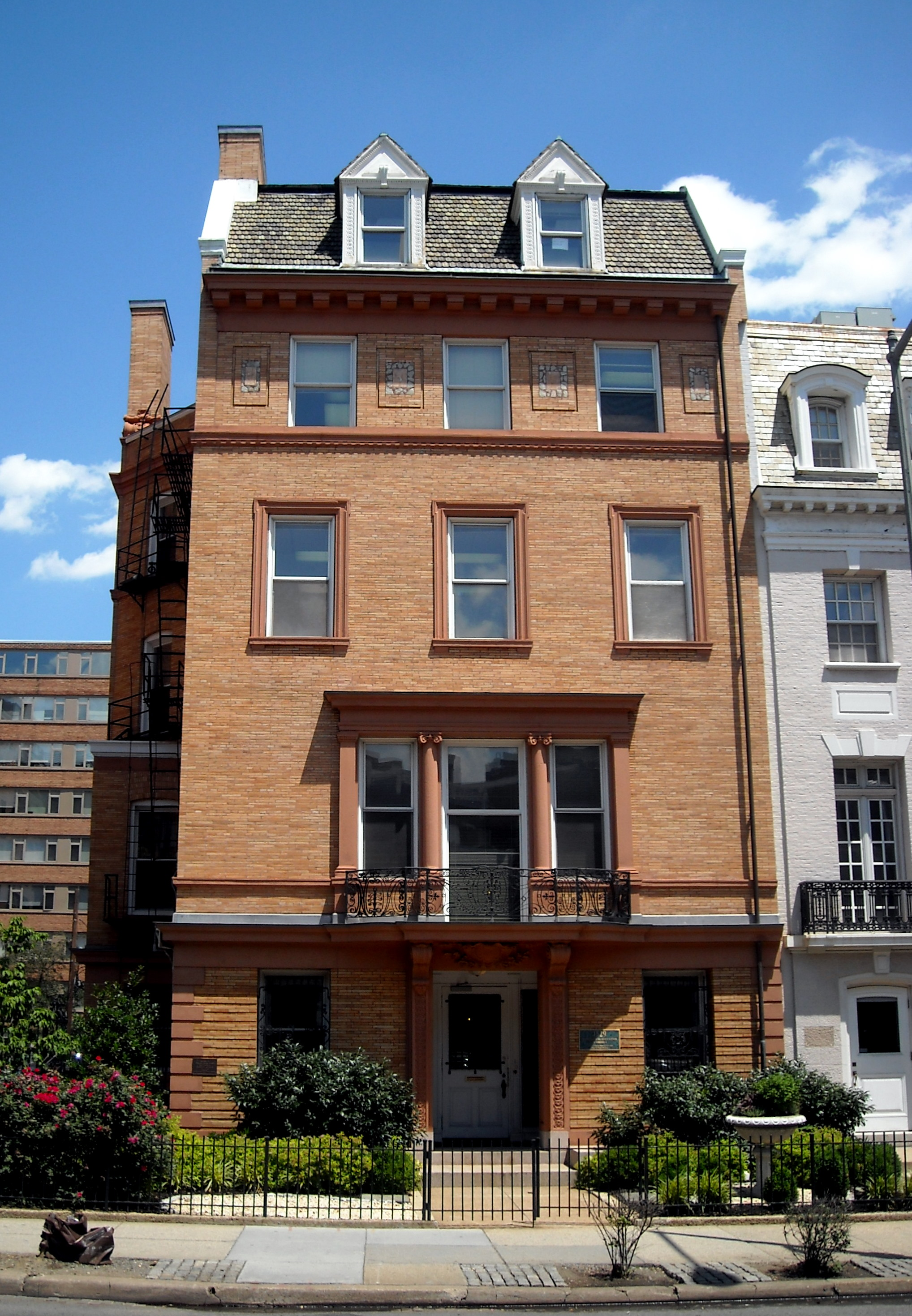
Former Cuban embassy and residence of Carlos Manuel de Céspedes y Quesada in Washington, D.C.

== Initial role in Cuban politics ==
He later entered Cuban politics and from 1902 to 1908, was vice president of the Cuban House of Representatives. Then in 1909, he joined the Cuban diplomatic service and represented his country as minister to Italy, and to Argentina, and as a special envoy to Greece. In 1914, he was Cuban Ambassador to the United States. He returned to Cuba in 1922, to become Foreign Minister under Gerardo Machado but resigned after a year. President Machado then named him Ambassador to Mexico, but Céspedes delayed his departure for reasons of ill health.

== Presidency ==
Thereafter, he was active in trying to overthrow Machado. In August 1933, Machado left Cuba and Céspedes was offered the position of President. He took office on August 13, 1933.

Céspedes's Cabinet included Gobernación, Colonel Federico Laredo Bru, Union Nacionalista Justicia, Dr. Carlos Saladrigas Zayas, A.B.C. Hacienda, Dr. Joaquín Martínez Sáenz, A.B.C. Obras Públicas, Eng. Eduardo J. Chibás, Liberal Agricultura, Dr. Rafael Santos Jiménez, Marianista Instrucción Pública, Dr Guillermo Belt, Union Nacionalista Sanidad y Beneficencia, Dr. Antonio Presno, University of Habana Comunicaciones, Dr. Nicasio Silverior, O.C.R.R. Guerra y Marina, Demetrio Castillo Pokorny, non-partisan Presidencia, Dr. Raul de Cardenas y Echarte, Conservative.

Already by August 19, 1933, Sumner Welles noted the increasing tension that remained within the Cuban army after Céspedes's assumption of the presidency. The reasons for the tensions within the army included that various officials of Machado's administration were allowed to leave the country, that high-ranking army officials who were part of Machado's administration still held their army positions, and that General Sanguily, the Army Chief of Staff, was still hospitalized. Welles noted the following on August 24, 1933:

"I am rapidly coming to the conclusion that my original hope that the present Government of Cuba (Céspedes' administration) could govern as a constitutional government for the remainder of the term for which General Machado had himself elected must be abandoned. If the solid and unwavering support of the Army could be counted on, and if the groups and parties represented in the present Government were unanimous in their support of the administration, it might be possible for the existing Government to maintain itself, pass the necessary legislation of all kinds required, and hold the general national elections in November 1934 as originally anticipated. As a matter of fact, however, a general process of disintegration is going on. The Army is by no means in a satisfactory condition and the relapse in the health of General Sanguily, Chief of Staff and the one ranking officer in the Cuban Army who can command the support of his subordinates, has delayed the taking of the measures necessary to enforce discipline within the Army which he alone could have undertaken satisfactorily.

Given those circumstances, Welles proposed that "general elections may be held approximately 3 months from now so that Cuba may once more have a constitutional government in the real sense of the word." Céspedes agreed, and on August 25, 1933, issued Presidential Decree 1298, which basically annulled the 1928 constitutional reforms and re-established the 1901 Constitution of Cuba in its entirety, terminated the presidential mandate of Machado, dissolved the Cuban Congress, vacated the seats of the Supreme Court of Cuba, and declared that a general election would be held on February 24, 1934, for a new presidential term to begin on May 20, 1934. The decree was clearly intended to provide political stability and bring public confidence to Cespedes’ Administration. Despite its intention Cespedes’ Administration would only last for an additional 11 days from the date of its pronouncement. The decree stated as follows:

To the people of Cuba:

Whereas the Congress of the Republic in the exercise of the powers established in article 115 of the constitution resolved by the law of June 21st, 1927 to amend certain provisions of the constitution;

Whereas in the call of the election for delegates of the constitutional convention the laws by virtue of which the reorganization of political parties had been prohibited remained in force as well as that prohibiting the organization of new parties and other laws were enacted prohibiting the presentation of independent candidatures all of which legal provisions had no object other than to carry into effect the amendment to the constitution with absolute disregard of the popular will inasmuch as the electors opposed to said amendment were not able to elect delegates to aforesaid constitutional convention in manifest infringement of article 38 of the constitution which recognizes the right of suffrage to all Cubans over 21 years of age;

Whereas, the constitutional convention elected to that effect did not limit its acts to the approval or disapproval of the amendment voted by Congress in accordance with the provisions of article 115 of the constitution above-cited but overstepping its authority proceeded to change certain provisions of the law which contained the amendment;

Whereas, one of the provisions which was the one of modification was that by virtue of which the presidential term of office which should have expired on May 20, 1929, was extended for two years to May 20, 1931, and which, furthermore, prohibited the reelection of the President of the Republic then in office, the change consisting in permitting said chief executive to be reelected for the next presidential term;

Whereas, on May 11, 1928, the amendment of the constitution was promulgated by the President of the Republic, the same containing as has been said important changes in the text of the law which had been voted and passed by Congress; Whereas, in the emergency electoral law of July 20, 1928, a series of provisions were included tending to assure the reelection of the person who at that time held the Presidency of the Republic and at the same time to prevent the presentation of other candidates for the same office which objects were achieved with absolute disregard of the popular will;

Whereas, the Supreme Court of Justice en banc in several decisions handed down in writs of unconstitutionality has recognized that the constitutional convention in altering the text of some of the provisions of the amendment law infringed the provision contained in article 115 of the constitution so often cited; Whereas, all the illegalities and overriding of authority which have been mentioned constituted a coup d’état against the popular sovereignty and gave rise to an intense revolutionary agitation which obliged the Government constantly to maintain in suspense the individual guarantees and to appeal to all class of violence in order to appease the protests of the people;

Whereas, the good offices of the Ambassador of the United States of America to procure a solution to such an intense political crisis having been offered and accepted and the President of the Republic having refused to give performance to the essential obligations acquired by the parties within the negotiations which were being carried on, the revolutionary state became more acute to such an extent that he was forced to resolve the abandonment of the power and withdraw from the national territory in use of a leave of absence at the same time leaving a full resignation of his office;

Whereas, by virtue of said leave of absence I have provisionally assumed the Presidency of the Republic;

Whereas, a large number of Senators and Representatives have presented the resignation of their offices and others have left the country without requesting a leave of absence;

Whereas, in view of everything that has been set forth above and with the object of re-establishing constitutional legality and restoring tranquility to the country, interpreting the popular will which is clearly manifested at this time throughout the country, conscious of the national conventionalities and of the transcendency of the measures I am adopting, with my thoughts placed on the founders of the nation and on the welfare of the Republic, and having heard the opinion of my Cabinet, I proceed to issue the following decree:

1st. The text of the constitution of 1901 is re-established in its full force and effect and consequently the constitutional amendment promulgated on May 11th, 1928, remains null and without any value or effect.

2nd.Therefore, the mandate attributed to citizen Gerardo Machado y Morales as President of the Republic is hereby terminated.

3rd.The present Congress is declared dissolved and as a consequence the mandates of the Senators and Representatives as well as the rights of their substitutes to take their places are terminated.

4th.The offices of Justices of the Supreme Court filled after May 20th, 1929, are hereby declared vacant.

5th.The mandates of all the other officials of popular election are hereby declared at an end, nevertheless, those holding such offices at the present time shall remain in the discharge thereof until the Government shall order what it deems proper in each case.

6th.On February 24th, 1934, general elections shall be held for the filling of all offices which have their origin in popular suffrage, the new Presidential term of office to be inaugurated on May 20th of that year.

7th. An advisory commission shall be created charged with the proposing of the modifications considered indispensable to carry into effect the measures contained in this decree, and the recommendations of the said commission once approved in whole or in part shall be promulgated by the Executive.

8th. The Government shall respect and give fulfillment to all international obligations contracted in the name of the Republic even though they may be dated after May 20th, 1929.

9th. All the Secretaries of the Cabinet are entrusted with the fulfillment of this decree insofar as it may be pertinent to each of them.

Given at the Presidential Palace in Habana on August 24, 1933. Signed Carlos Manuel de Céspedes, President. Signed Carlos Saladrigas, Secretary of Justice and Acting Secretary of State.”

Despite those measures, on September 4–5, 1933, the Sergeants' Revolt took place while Céspedes was in Matanzas and Santa Clara after a hurricane had ravaged those regions. The hurricane having cost the lives of 200 people and property damages in the millions. Upon returning and reaching the presidential palace, Ramón Grau and members of the DEU or Directorio Estudiantil Universitario were awaiting him. "At 1 p.m. the Cespedes Cabinet resigned and President Cespedes left the Palace to go to his own house. Very little disorder took place. Immediately thereafter the Committee of five members (Pentarchy of 1933) of the revolutionary group took possession of the Palace as the executive power of the Cuban Republic."

== Later life ==
He then returned to the Foreign Service and became the Cuban Ambassador to Spain. In 1935, he returned to Cuba and wrote several books including Carlos Manuel de Céspedes, Las Banderas de Yara y de Bayamo, and Manuel de Quesada y Loynaz.

He received numerous honors and awards including the Grand Cross of the Order of Carlos Manuel de Céspedes of Cuba, the Grand Cross of Belgium, the Grand Cross of Italy, the Grand Cross of Peru, the Grand Cross of the Spanish Republic, the Grand Ribbon of the Order of the Liberator of Venezuela, the Order of Merit (Chile), Commander of the National Order of the Legion of Honour of France, and of the Order of Saints Maurice and Lazarus of Italy.

He died on March 28, 1939, in Vedado, Havana, of a heart attack and is buried at Cementerio de Cristóbal Colón in Havana.
