= La Cabaña =

18th-century fortress complex in Havana, Cuba

Coordinates: 23°08′50″N 82°21′00″W

Fortress of San Carlos de La Cabaña, Havana
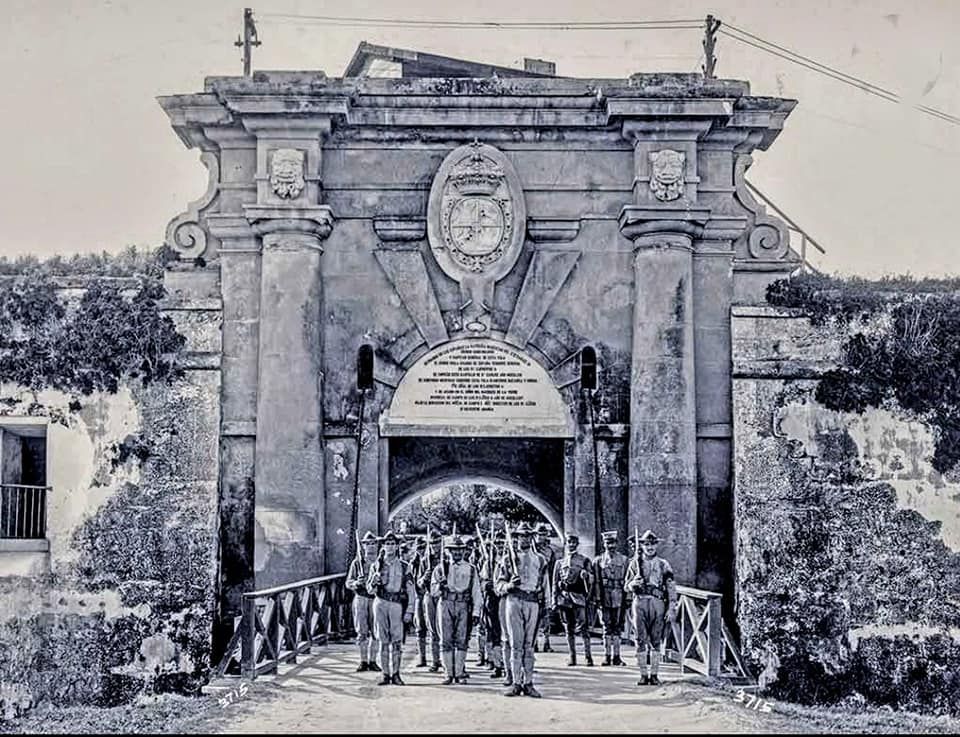
- Postcard of 1920 of Fortress of La Cabaña
- Interactive map of the Fortress of San Carlos de La Cabaña, Havana area

General information
- Type: Defense building
- Architectural style: Baroque
- Location: Havana, Cuba
- Groundbreaking: 1763
- Completed: 1774

Technical details
- Structural system: Load bearing
- Material: Masonry

Fortaleza de San Carlos de la Cabaña (Spanish pronunciation: [foɾtaˌlesa de ˌsan ˌkaɾlos de la kaˈbaɲa]; lit. 'Fort of Saint Charles of the Cabin'), colloquially known as La Cabaña, is an 18th-century fortress complex, the third-largest in the Americas, located on the elevated eastern side of the harbor entrance in Havana, Cuba. The fort rises above the 60-meter (200 ft) hilltop, along with Morro Castle. The fort is part of the Old Havana World Heritage Site which was created in 1982.

== History ==
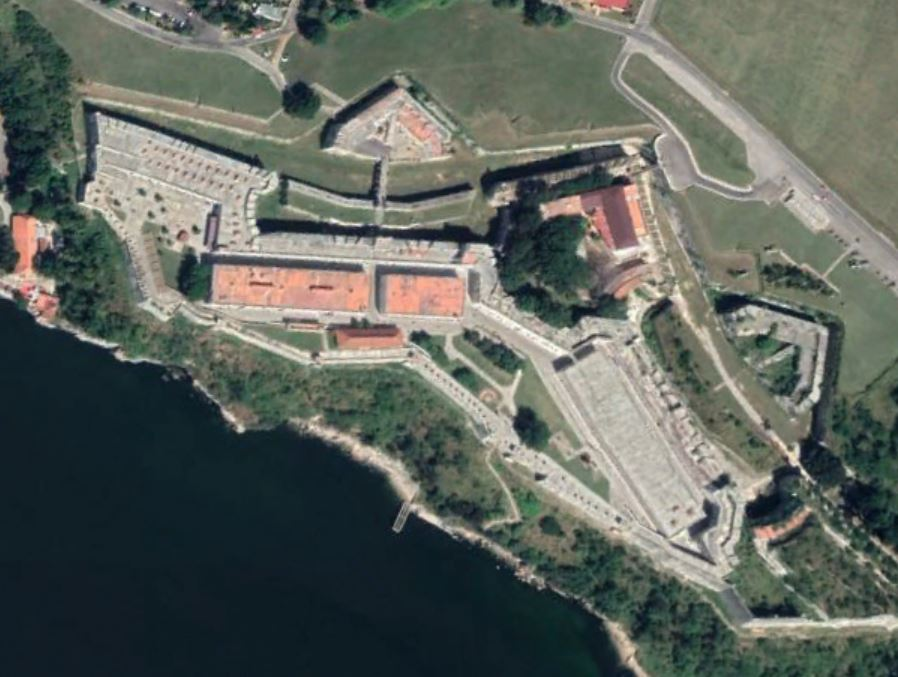
La Cabaña. Havana Cuba. As it appears in 2020.

After the capture of Havana by British forces in 1762, an exchange was soon made to return Havana to the Spanish, the controlling colonial power of Cuba, in exchange for Florida. A key factor in the British capture of Havana turned out to be the overland vulnerability of El Morro. This realization and the fear of further attacks following British colonial conquests in the Seven Years War prompted the Spanish to build a new fortress to improve the overland defense of Havana; King Carlos III of Spain began the construction of La Cabaña in 1763. Replacing earlier and less extensive fortifications next to the 16th-century El Morro fortress, La Cabaña was the second-largest colonial military installation in the New World by the time it was completed in 1774 (after the St. Felipe de Barajas fortification at Cartagena, Colombia), at great expense to Spain. In charge of the construction was the colonel of engineers, the Navarrese Silvestre Abarca y Aznar.

Over the next two hundred years the fortress served as a base for both Spain and later independent Cuba – La Cabaña has been used as a prison by the government of Fidel Castro and his younger brother Raúl.

Fortaleza de San Carlos de la Cabaña in Havana, about 1910s

== 1959 ==
In January 1959, the revolutionary group led by Fidel Castro seized La Cabaña; the defending Cuban Army unit offered no resistance and surrendered. Che Guevara used the fortress as a headquarters and military prison for several months. During his five-month tenure in that post (January 2 through June 12, 1959), Guevara oversaw the revolutionary tribunals and executions of people who had opposed the communist revolution, including former members of Buró de Represión de Actividades Comunistas, Batista's secret police. There were 176 executions by Che Guevara documented for La Cabaña Fortress prison during Che’s command (January 3 to November 26, 1959).

=== La Cabaña, land reform, and literacy ===
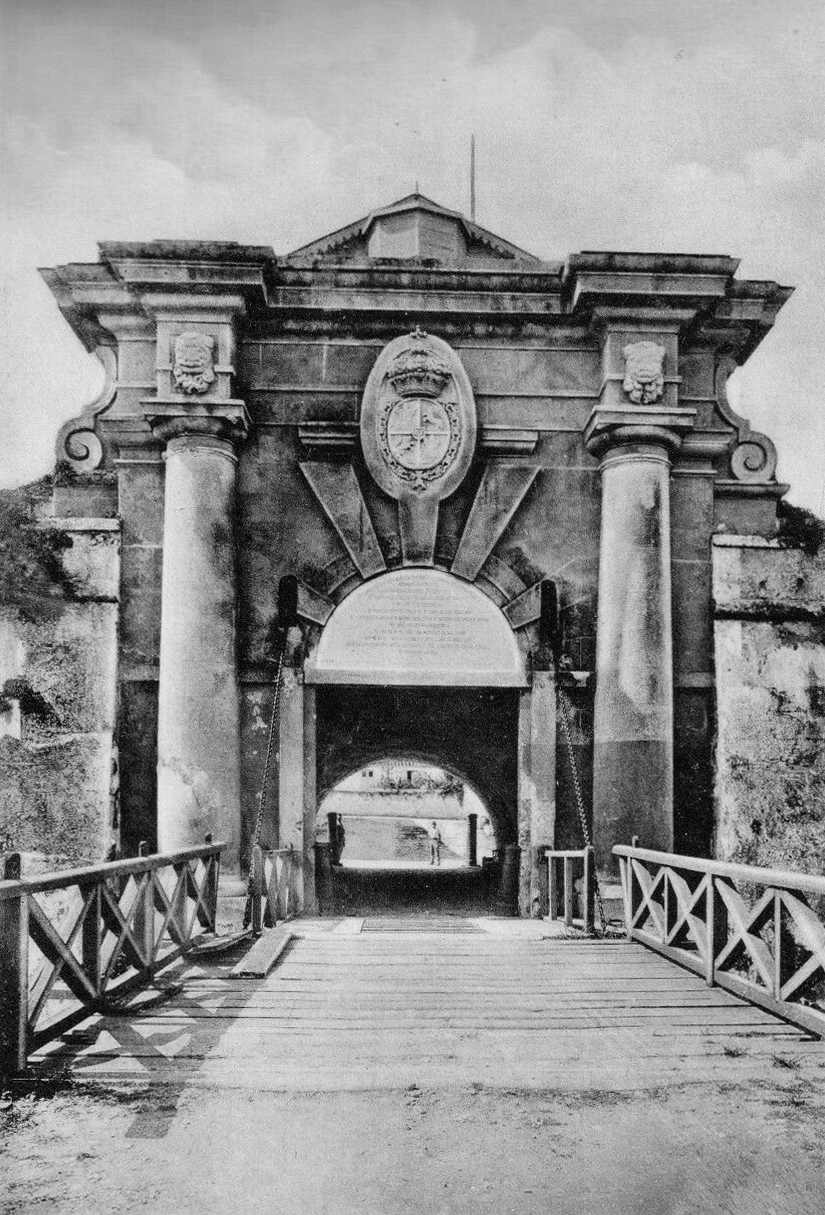
La Cabaña Castle entrance in 1908.

The first major political crisis arose over what to do with the captured Batista officials who had perpetrated the worst of the repression. During the rebellion against Batista's dictatorship, the general command of the rebel army, led by Fidel Castro, introduced into the territories under its control the 19th-century penal law commonly known as the Ley de la Sierra (Law of the Sierra). This law included the death penalty for serious crimes, whether perpetrated by the Batista regime or by supporters of the revolution. In 1959 the revolutionary government extended its application to the whole of the republic and to those it considered war criminals, captured and tried after the revolution. According to the Cuban Ministry of Justice, this latter extension was supported by the majority of the population, and followed the same procedure as those in the Nuremberg trials held by the Allies after World War II.

=== Revolutionary justice ===
To implement a portion of this plan, Castro named Guevara commander of the La Cabaña prison, for a five-month tenure (2 January through 12 June 1959). Guevara was charged by the new government with purging the Batista army and consolidating victory by exacting "revolutionary justice" against those regarded as traitors, chivatos (informants), or war criminals. As commander of La Cabaña, Guevara reviewed the appeals of those convicted during the revolutionary tribunal process.

=== Tribunals ===
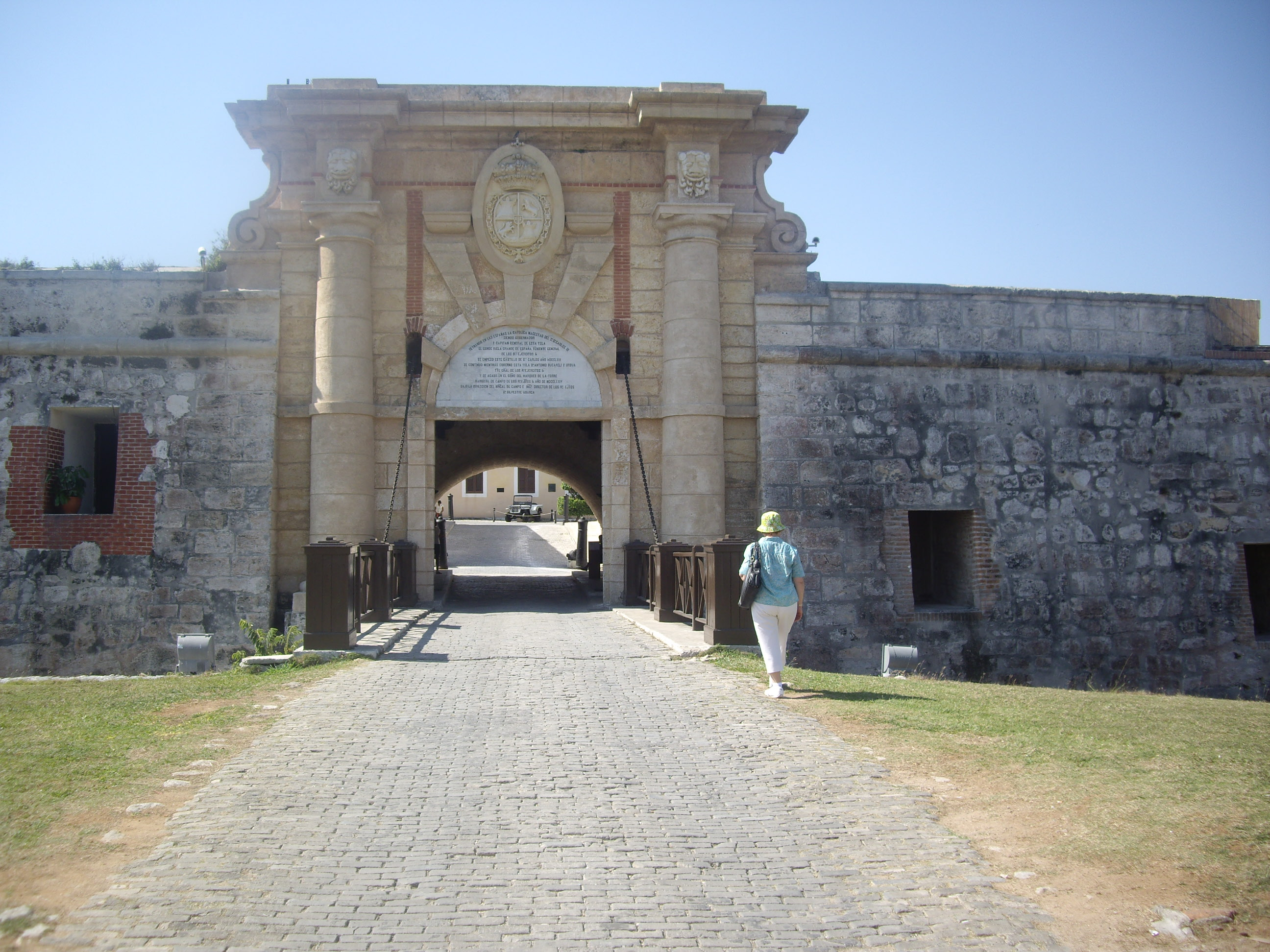
Entrance of La Cabaña Castle, 2013.

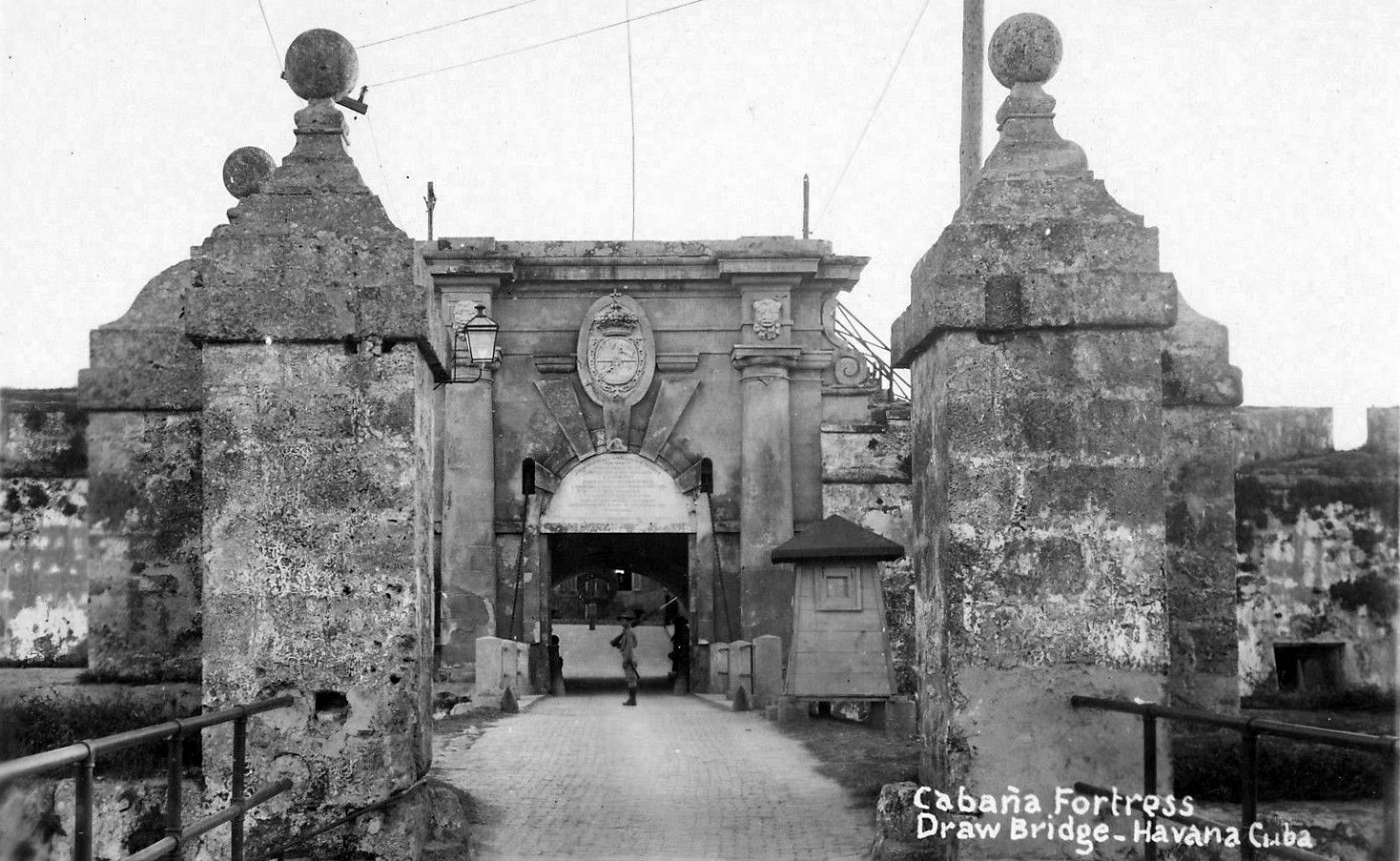
Drawbridge in 1935.

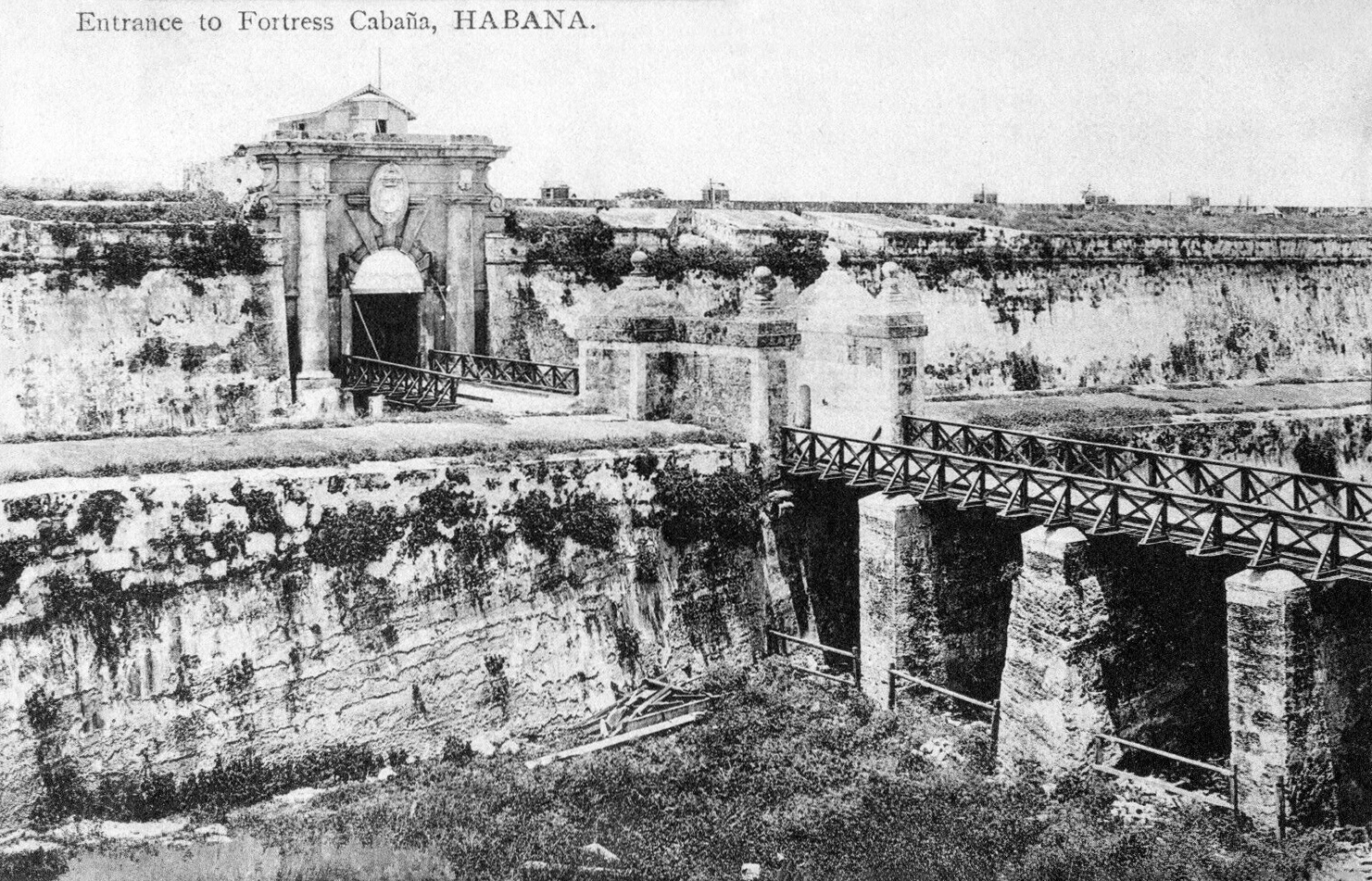
Entrance in 1910.

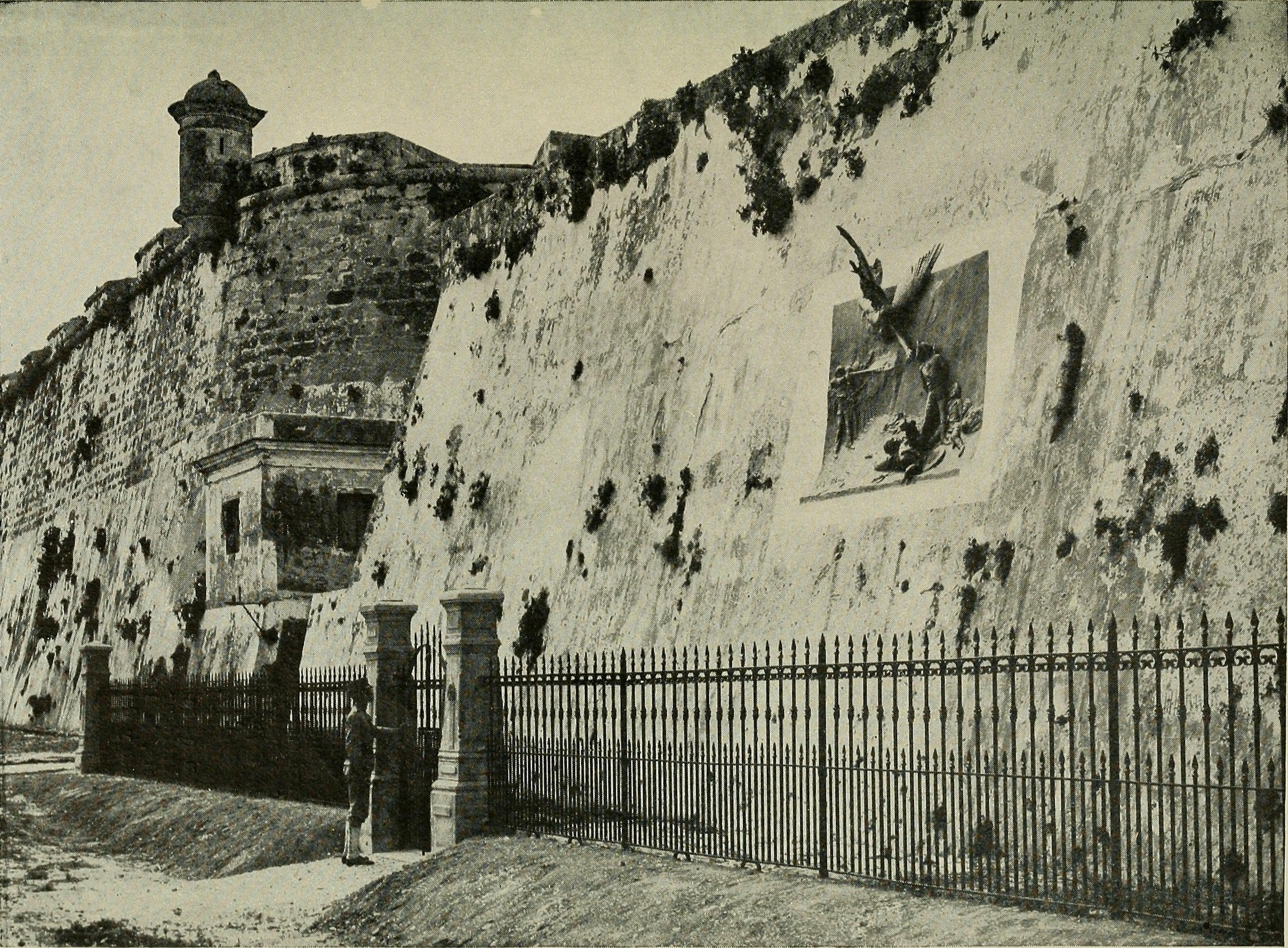
Place of execution of independentist rebels, 1904.

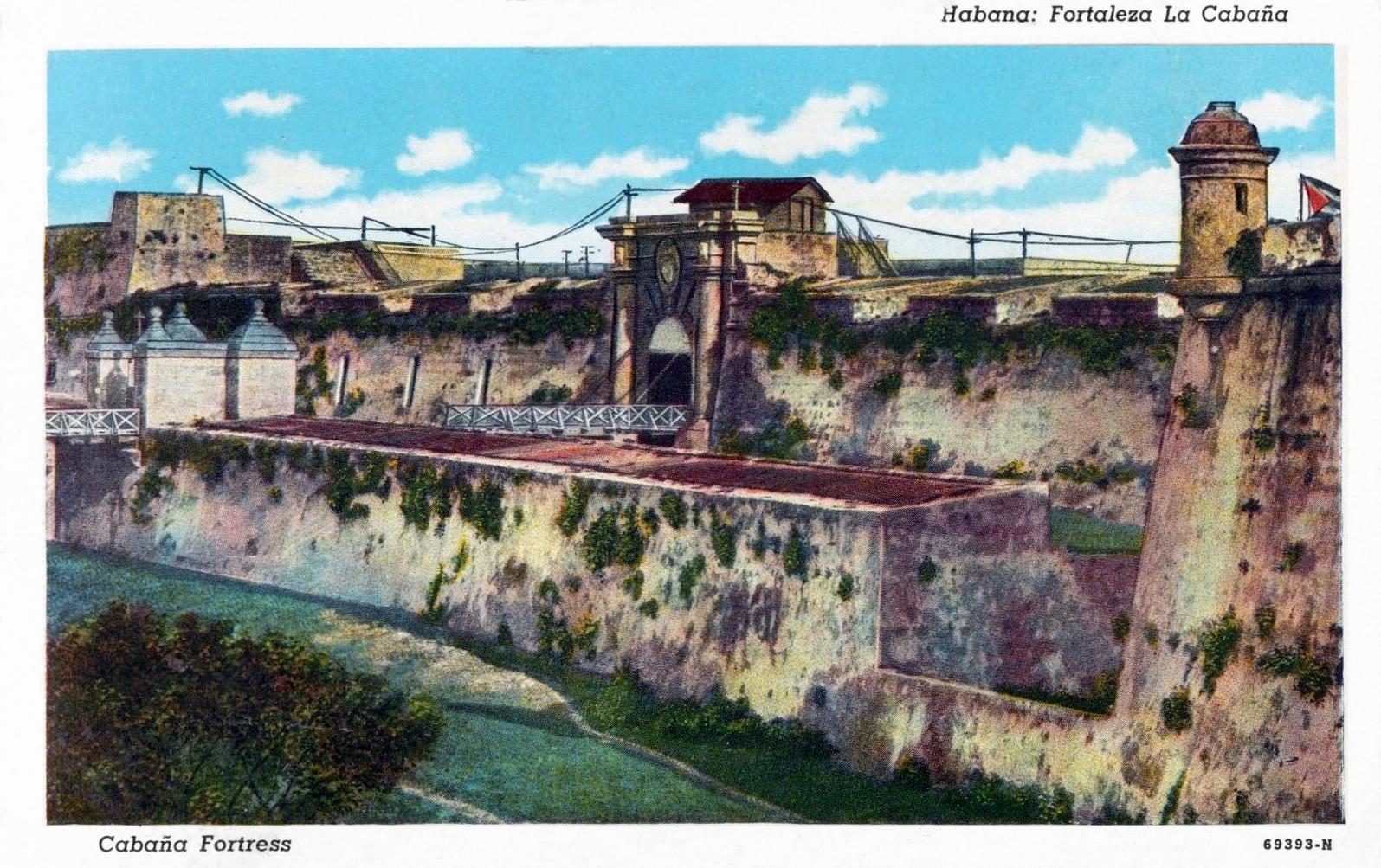
La Cabaña Castle in 1916.

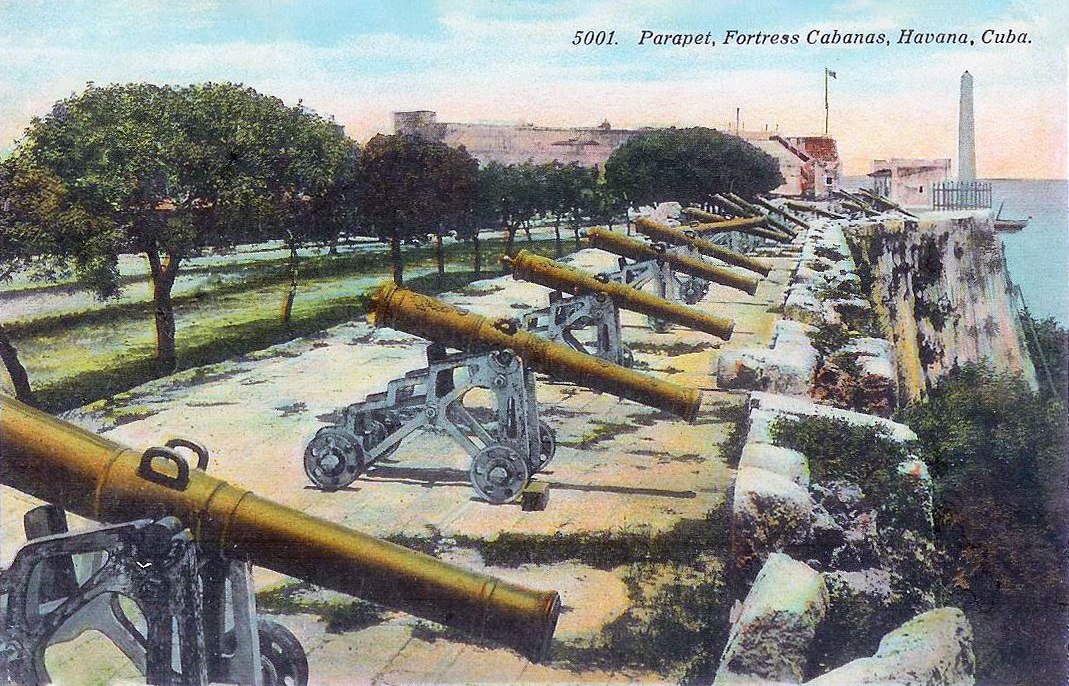
Parapet, San Carlos de la Cabaña Fortress, Havana, in 1908.

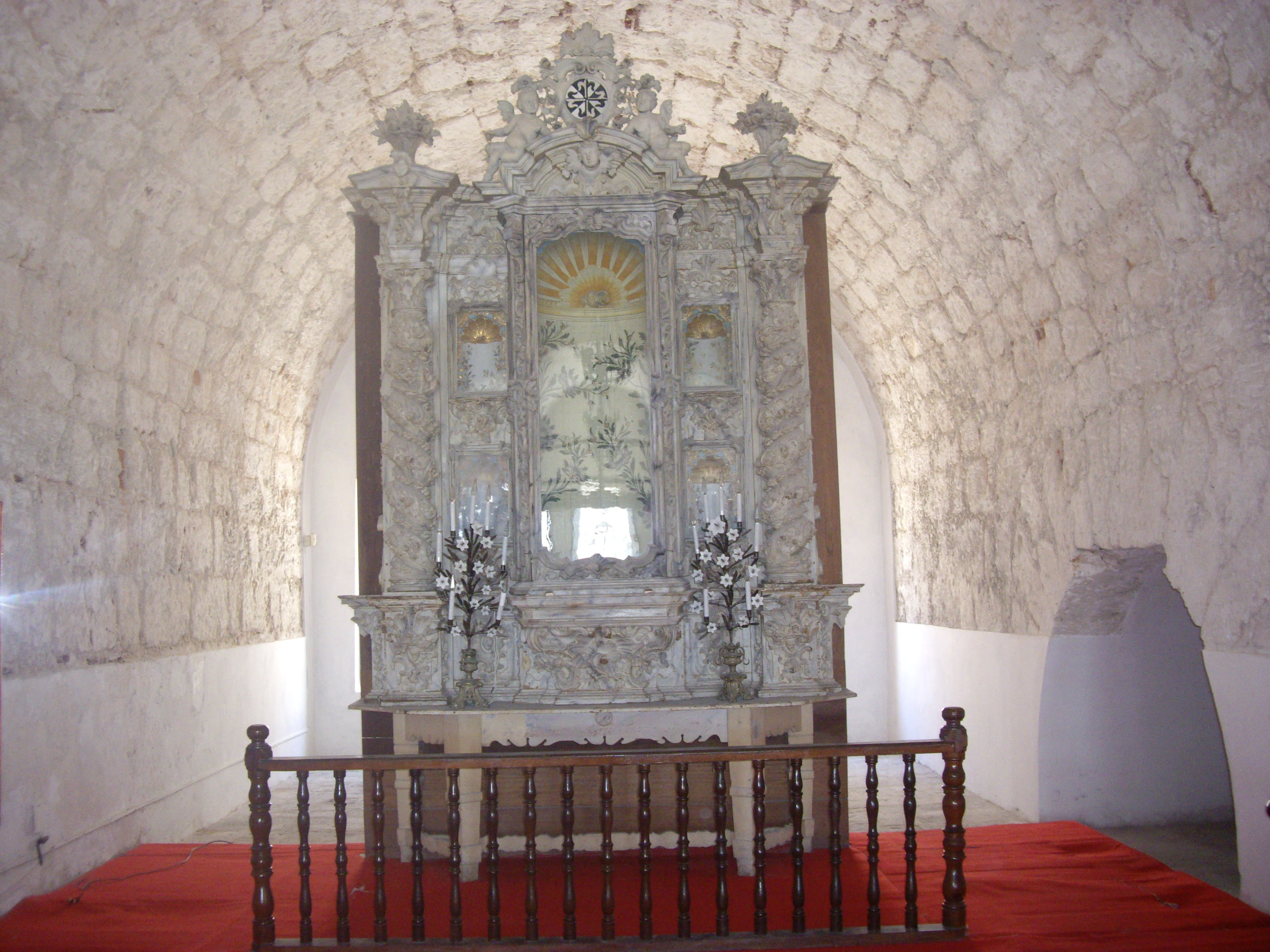
Interior of the Chapel of La Cabaña Castle.

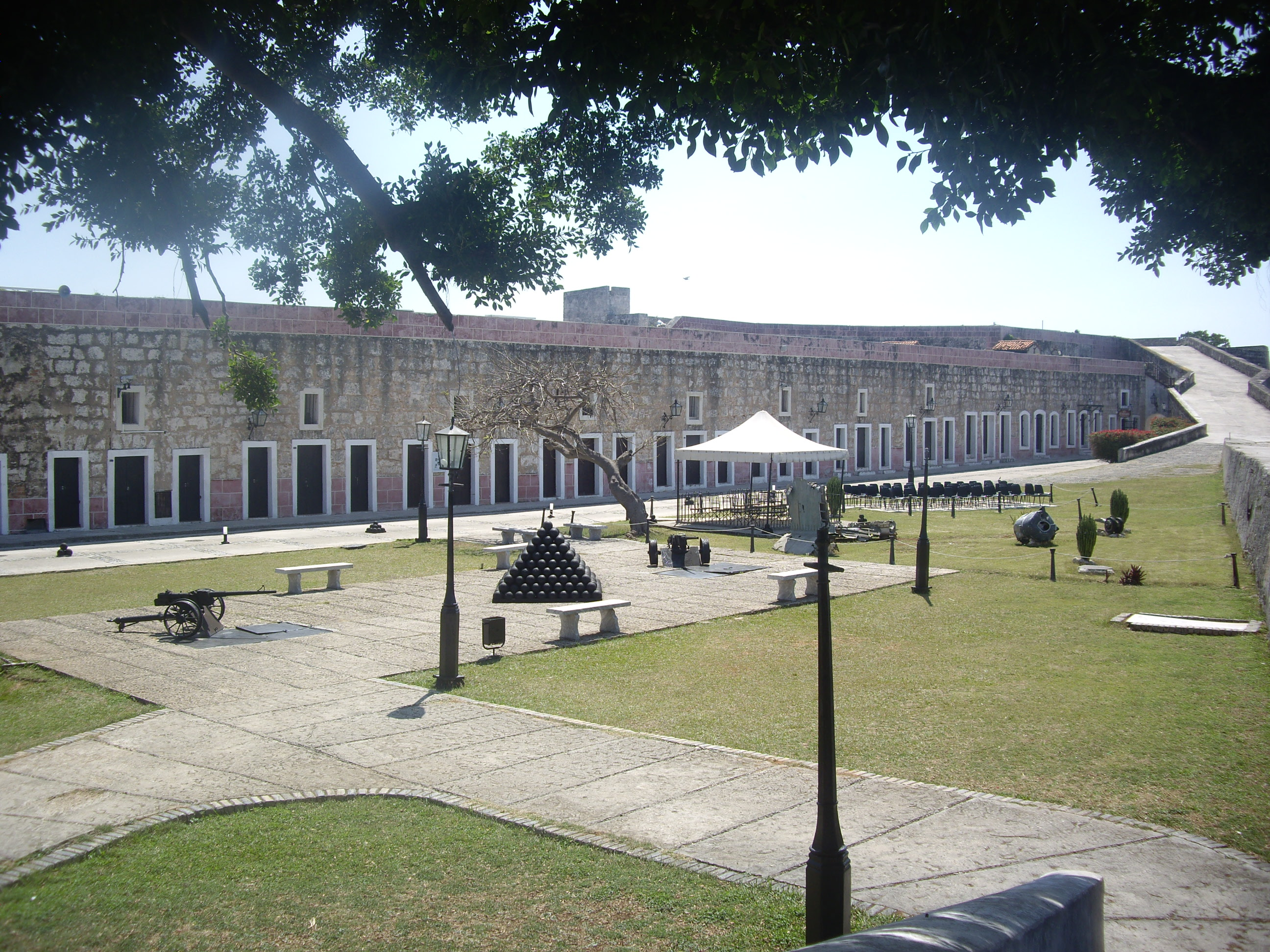
Plaza de Armas, of La Cabaña Castle.

The tribunals were conducted by 2–3 army officers, an assessor, and a respected local citizen. On some occasions the penalty delivered by the tribunal was death by firing-squad. Raúl Gómez Treto, senior legal advisor to the Cuban Ministry of Justice, has argued that the death penalty was justified in order to prevent citizens themselves from taking justice into their own hands, as had happened twenty years earlier in the anti-Machado rebellion. Biographers note that in January 1959 the Cuban public was in a "lynching mood", and point to a survey at the time showing 93% public approval for the tribunal process. Moreover, a 22 January 1959, Universal Newsreel broadcast in the United States and narrated by Ed Herlihy featured Fidel Castro asking an estimated one million Cubans whether they approved of the executions, and being met with a roaring "¡Si!" (yes). With as many as 20,000 Cubans estimated to have been killed at the hands of Batista's collaborators, and many of the accused war criminals sentenced to death accused of torture and physical atrocities, the newly-empowered government carried out executions, punctuated by cries from the crowds of "¡al paredón!" ([to the] wall!), which biographer Jorge Castañeda describes as "without respect for due process".

=== Executions ===
Although accounts vary, it is estimated that several hundred people were executed nationwide during this time, with Guevara's jurisdictional death total at La Cabaña ranging from 55 to 105. (Note: "I have yet to find a single credible source pointing to a case where Che executed "an innocent". Those persons executed by Guevara or on his orders were condemned for the usual crimes punishable by death at times of war or in its aftermath: desertion, treason or crimes such as rape, torture or murder. I should add that my research spanned five years, and included anti-Castro Cubans among the Cuban-American exile community in Miami and elsewhere."Jon Lee Anderson, author of Che Guevara: A Revolutionary Life, PBS forum) Conflicting views exist of Guevara's attitude towards the executions at La Cabaña. Some exiled opposition biographers report that he relished the rituals of the firing squad, and organized them with gusto, while others relate that Guevara pardoned as many prisoners as he could. All sides acknowledge that Guevara had become a "hardened" man who had no qualms about the death penalty or about summary and collective trials. If the only way to "defend the revolution was to execute its enemies, he would not be swayed by humanitarian or political arguments". In a 5 February 1959 letter to Luis Paredes López in Buenos Aires Guevara states unequivocally: "The executions by firing squads are not only a necessity for the people of Cuba, but also an imposition of the people."

== Gallery ==
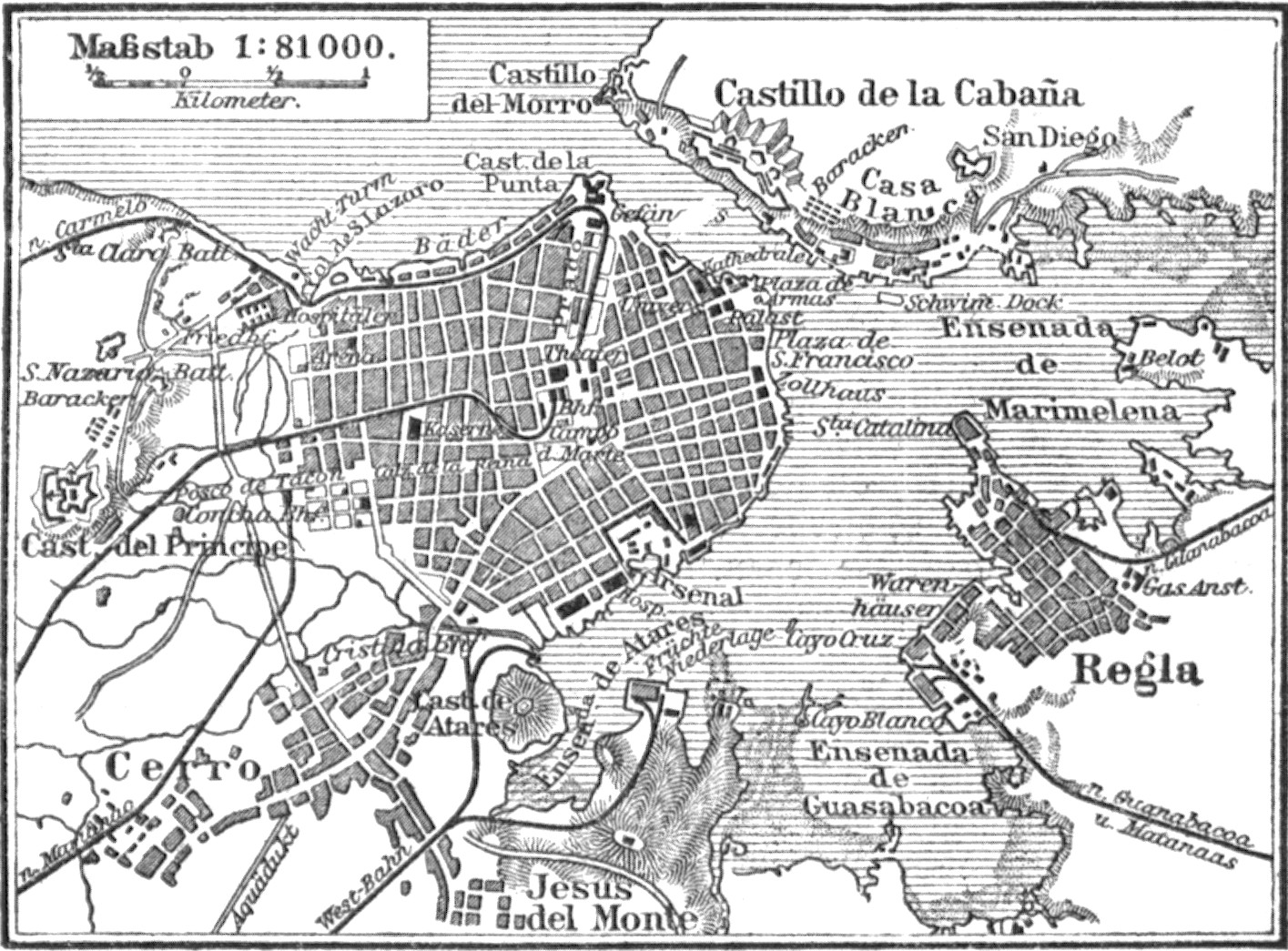
This 19th-century map of Havana shows La Cabaña's strategic location along the east side of the entrance to the city's harbor.

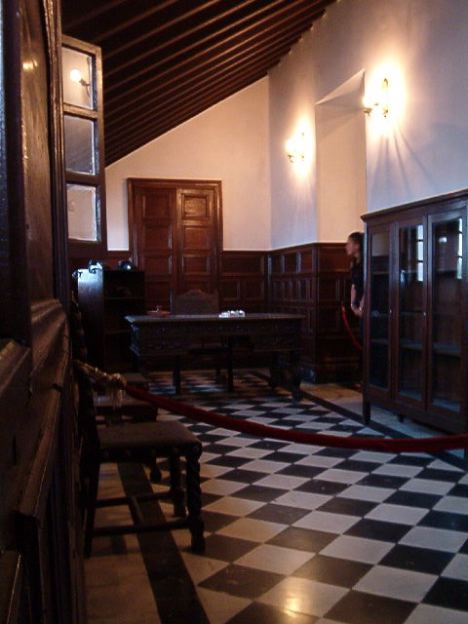
Che Guevara's former office at La Cabaña.

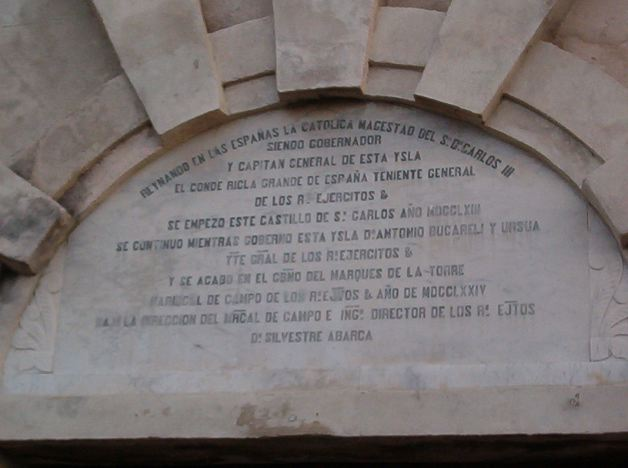
The inscription above the fortress gates.

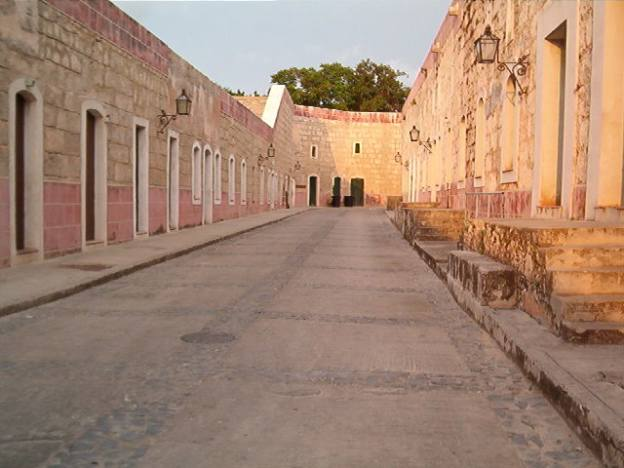
An avenue between buildings of the fortress.

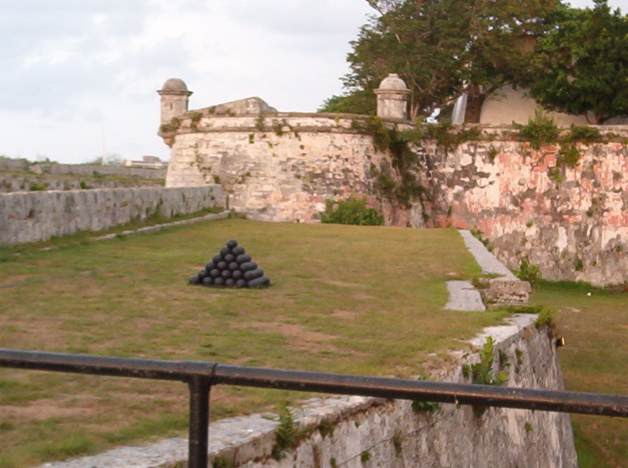
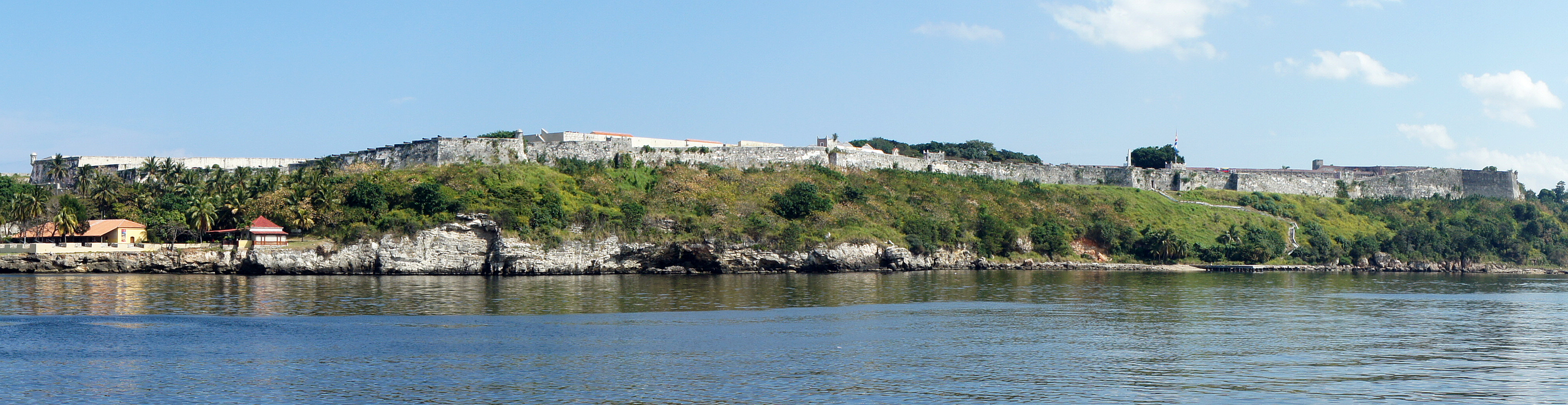
Panoramic view of Fortaleza de San Carlos de la Cabaña.

== See also ==
- List of buildings in Havana
