= First Lady of Cuba =

Cuban president's wife

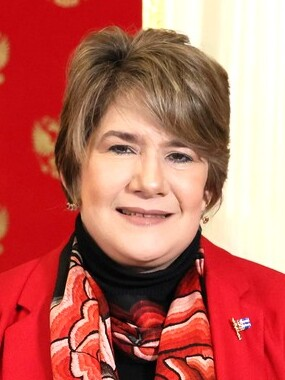
- Incumbent; Lis Cuesta Peraza since April 19, 2018
- Style: Her Excellency
- Residence: Palace of the Revolution
- Term length: 5 years
- Inaugural holder: Genoveva Guardiola Arbizú
- Formation: May 20, 1902 (124 years ago)
- Website: www.x.com/LisCuestaCuba

First Lady of Cuba (Spanish: Primera Dama de Cuba) is de facto title of the wife of the President of the Republic of Cuba. The current first lady of Cuba is Lis Cuesta Peraza, the second wife of President Miguel Díaz-Canel, who is also the First Secretary of the Communist Party of Cuba, the most senior position in the Cuban government. She is the first presidential wife to be referred to as "first lady" by Cuban state media since the 1960s.

== History ==
The term "First Lady of Cuba" was first used as far back as 1913 to refer to the wife of the Cuban president. The role of first lady is purely ceremonial, and the first ladies since the Cuban Revolution hold little official influence on the politics of Cuba. Although the wife of the president of Cuba is referred to unofficially as the "first lady", it is used in state ceremonies, protocol events, and international tours. However, no official government position currently exists, particularly since the Cuban Revolution, when the term was largely eliminated by the Castro brothers.

The position was regarded as a "remnant of capitalism" and fell into disuse during the rule of Fidel Castro. Castro and his first wife, Mirta Díaz-Balart, had divorced before the 1959 Cuban Revolution, which contributed to the decline of the role as well, according to Cuban writer, Wendy Guerra. However, Vilma Espín, Castro's sister-in-law and wife of Raúl Castro, took on the role of "Cuba's low-key first lady" for 45-years, even after Fidel Castro reportedly married Dalia Soto de Valle in 1980. Dalia Soto de Valle was not seen publicly until Pope John Paul II's visit to Cuba in January 1998.

In recent years, the concept of a national first lady has been revived under President Miguel Díaz-Canel and his wife, Lis Cuesta. In 2018, Cuesta became the first woman to be publicly referred to as "first lady" by some of Cuba's state-controlled broadcasters and other media outlets since the 1960s, while other state-run newspapers initially ignored her new role. Lis Cuesta Peraza was previously the Second Lady of the Republic of Cuba from the February 24, 2013, to April 19, 2018, during her husband's term as First Vice President of Cuba. As Second Lady of Cuba, she accompanied her husband on state tours to Angola, Laos, Vietnam, Chile, Russia, among others.

The current Second Lady of the Republic of Cuba is Julia Piloto Saborit (since April 2018), the wife of the current Vice President of Cuba, Salvador Valdes Mesa.

== First ladies of Cuba ==
=== First ladies of the Republic of Cuba (1902–1959) ===
Portrait	First Lady of Cuba	Term Began	Term Ended	President of Cuba	Notes
	Genoveva Guardiola Arbizú	May 20, 1902	September 28, 1906	Tomás Estrada Palma	Born in Honduras, Veva Guardiola was the inaugural First Lady of Cuba.
	América Arias	January 28, 1909	May 20, 1913	José Miguel Gómez	
	Mariana Seva de Menocal	May 20, 1913	May 20, 1921	Mario García Menocal	
	María de la Asunción Jaén y Planas	May 20, 1921	May 20, 1925	Alfredo Zayas y Alfonso	
	Elvira Machado Nodal	May 20, 1925	August 12, 1933	Gerardo Machado	Elvira Machado was Machado's cousin.
	Laura Bertini y Alessandri	August 13, 1933	September 5, 1933	Carlos Manuel de Céspedes y Quesada	Bertini, who married Carlos Manuel de Céspedes in 1915, was Italian. Mother of writer Alba de Céspedes.
	Polita Grau	September 10, 1933	January 15, 1934	Ramón Grau	Grau, who was unmarried, appointed his niece, Polita Grau, as first lady during his first presidency.
	Elisa Edelmann Ponce	January 15, 1934	January 18, 1934	Carlos Hevia	
	Mercedes Márquez Sterling	January 18, 1934	January 18, 1934	Manuel Márquez Sterling	
	Carmela Ledón	January 18, 1934	December 11, 1935	Carlos Mendieta	
	Marcela Cleard	December 11, 1935	May 20, 1936	José Agripino Barnet	
	Serafina Diago Cárdenas	May 20, 1936	December 24, 1936	Miguel Mariano Gómez	Serafina Diago Cárdenas was married to President Miguel Mariano Gómez, the son of former first lady, América Arias.
	Leonor Gómez Montes	December 24, 1936	October 10, 1940	Federico Laredo Brú	
	Elisa Godínez Gómez de Batista	October 10, 1940	October 10, 1944	Fulgencio Batista	Elisa Godinez Gomez was Batista's first wife and first lady from 1940 to 1944. Batista divorced her in 1945 after leaving office and soon married his mistress, Marta Fernandez Miranda de Batista.
	Paulina Alsina Fernández	October 10, 1944	October 10, 1948	Ramón Grau	President Grau never married. He appointed his sister-in-law, Paulina Alsina Fernández, as first lady during his second presidency.
	Mary Tarrero-Serrano	October 10, 1948	March 10, 1952	Carlos Prío Socarrás	Tarrero was also a stenographer in the national Senate. Prio was overthrown by Batista in the 1952 Cuban coup d'état.
	Marta Fernandez Miranda de Batista	March 10, 1952	January 1, 1959	Fulgencio Batista	Batista's second wife and first lady during his dictatorship. Both went into permanent exile following his ouster during the Cuban Revolution in 1959.
	Ana Durán	January 1, 1959	January 2, 1959	Anselmo Alliegro y Milá	Interim presidency
	María Luisa Martínez Díaz	January 2, 1959	January 3, 1959	Carlos Manuel Piedra	Interim presidency

=== Post Revolution (1959–Present) ===
Portrait	First Lady of Cuba	Term Began	Term Ended	President of Cuba	Notes
	Esperanza Llaguno Aguirre	January 3, 1959	July 18, 1959	Manuel Urrutia Lleó	Interim president following the ouster of Batista. Though married, President Manuel Urrutia did not introduce his wife, Esperanza Llaguno Aguirre, as first lady (or any other public position) during his presidency.
	María de la Caridad Molina	July 18, 1959	December 2, 1976	Osvaldo Dorticós Torrado	Though married, President Osvaldo Dorticós did not introduce his wife, María de la Caridad Molina, as first lady (or any other public position) during his presidency.
	Vilma Espín (acting)	December 2, 1976	February 24, 2008	Fidel Castro	The concept of a public "First Lady" fell into disuse following the Cuban Revolution under President Fidel Castro. Little was known about Castro's private life during his rule and he was divorced when he officially became president in 1976, which contributed to the position's decline. However, Vilma Espín, wife of Raúl Castro, took on the role of "Cuba's low-key first lady" for 45-years, even after Fidel Castro reportedly married Dália Soto del Valle in 1980. Espín was also a Secretary of State and had established the Federation of Cuban Women in 1960. Celia Sánchez, another Cuban revolutionary and close confidante of Castro, also served as a Secretary of State and fulfilled some of the roles traditionally attributed to a first lady as well.
	Vilma Espín	July 31, 2006	June 18, 2007	Raúl Castro	Vilma Espín died in Havana on June 18, 2007, during her husband's acting presidency.
	Position vacant	June 18, 2007	April 19, 2018	Raúl Castro	Vilma Espín had died in Havana on June 18, 2007. Mariela Castro Espín, daughter of Vilma Espín and Raúl Castro, assumed a protocol role for her father at times during his presidency.
	Lis Cuesta Peraza	April 19, 2018	Present	Miguel Díaz-Canel	The concept and role of a first lady began to revive under Díaz-Canel and Cuesta. In 2018, Cuesta, a tourism executive, became the first woman to be called "first lady" by some Cuban state-run media outlets since the 1960s.
