= List of ambassadors of Spain to Cuba =

Coordinates: 23.143908°N 82.357088°W

Ambassador of Spain to Cuba
- Coat of Arms of Spain

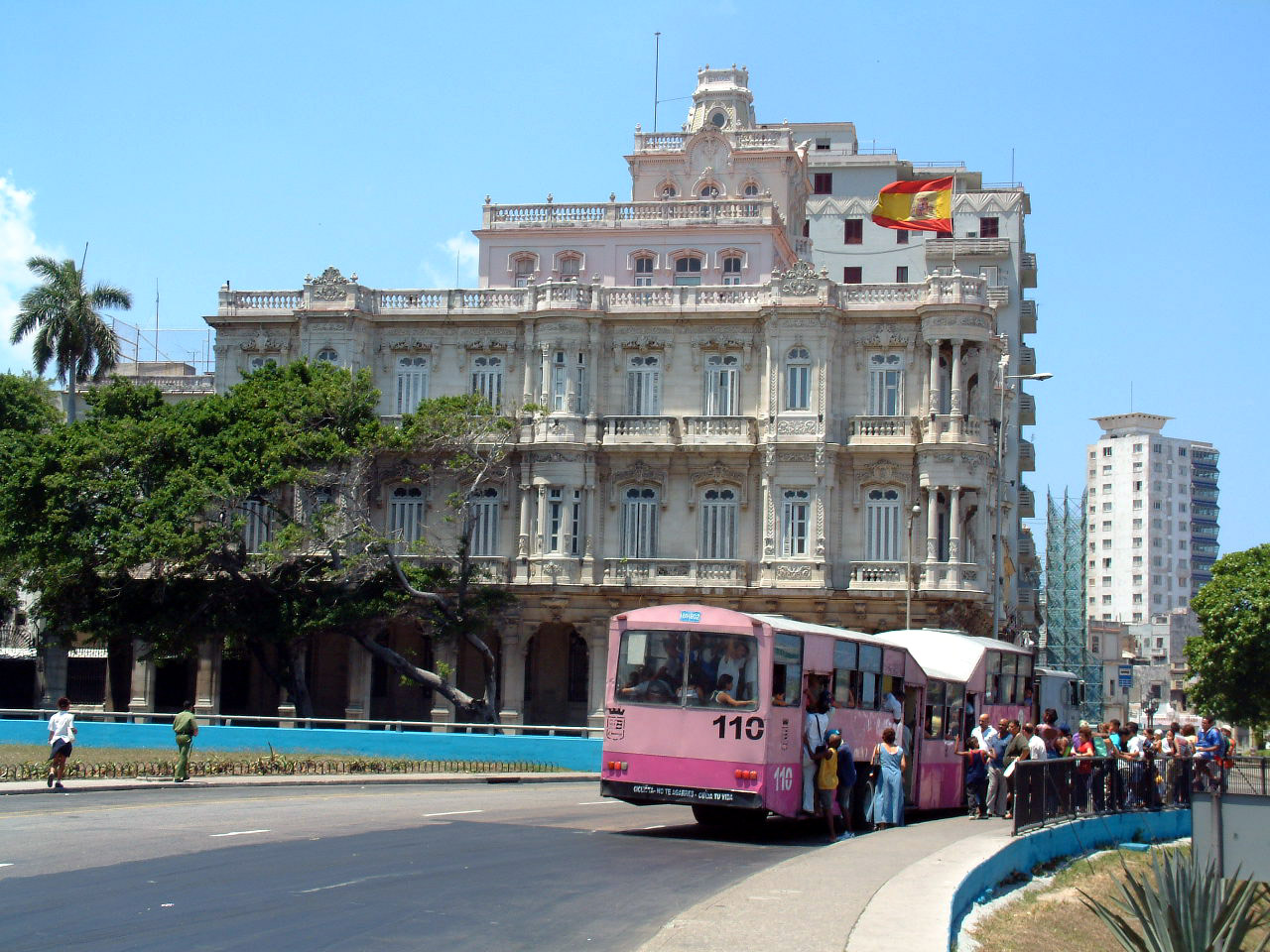
- Incumbent; Juan Fernández Trigo since October 1, 2018
- Style: His Excellency
- Appointer: The Monarch
- Inaugural holder: Ramón Gaytán de Ayala y Brunet
- Formation: 1904

The ambassador of the Kingdom of Spain to the Republic of Cuba is the official representative of the Spanish government to the government of Cuba.

== History ==
After the Spanish–American War of 1898–1903, Cuba, the last Spanish colonial territory in America, achieved its independence. Spain decided to maintain its diplomatic relations uninterruptedly with the island since 1902 (with the appointment of a Charge d'Affaires in Havana), which were consolidated in the year 1903. Therefore, the first bilateral relations between Spain and Cuba were maintained by mutual interest, which will be determined by the long and intense stage of colonization, as by Cuba's peculiar dependence on the United States. These relations were immersed in a delicate political-economic context in Cuba, marked by the North American interventions and changes of the Spanish diplomatic representative. Hence, the Spanish Minister of Foreign Affairs in 1909, Pablo Soler Guardiola, considered that the plaza in Havana was the most difficult and important of all the Spanish diplomatic representation of the time abroad. One of the results is that the old Consulate was elevated to the rank of Legation in the year 1904, and this in turn to the Embassy in 1927, thus intensifying trade relations, opening of consulates, and the signing of treaties and agreements in mainly commercial, financial, tourism and communication areas. In the course of the years 1958 to 1960, in the words of Juan Pablo de Lojendio, Ambassador of Spain in Cuba, the political situation was complicated by the defeat of General Batista and the recognition of the Revolutionary Government of Cuba by Spain. During this stage the Francoist administration in Spain maintained its concern about the outcome of the political situation in Cuba, notorious ideological differences between the two governments but without ruling out the principle of historical-cultural relationship between the two countries.

Royal decree elevating to Embassy the Legation of Spain in Cuba, published in the Madrid Gazette no. 166, of June 15, 1926.

Diplomatic accreditation	Ambassador	Observations	Head of government in Spain	Head of government in Cuba	Term end
1904	Ramón Gaytán de Ayala y Brunet	envoy	Alfonso XIII of Spain	Tomás Estrada Palma	1909
1909	Pablo Soler y Guardiola		Alfonso XIII of Spain	José Miguel Gómez	1910
1910	Julián María Arroyo y Moret de		Alfonso XIII of Spain	José Miguel Gómez	
1910	Cristóbal Fernández-Vallín y Alfonso		Alfonso XIII of Spain	José Miguel Gómez	1912
1912	Julián María de Arroyo y Moret		Alfonso XIII of Spain	José Miguel Gómez	1913
1913	Alfredo Mariátegui y Carratalá		Alfonso XIII of Spain	Mario García Menocal	1926
August 20, 1926	Francisco Gutiérrez de Agüera y Bayo	Ambassador	Alfonso XIII of Spain	Gerardo Machado	December 21, 1928
December 21, 1928	Santiago Méndez de Vigo y Méndez de Vigo		Alfonso XIII of Spain	Gerardo Machado	June 2, 1931
July 31, 1931	Francisco Serrat y Bonastre		Niceto Alcalá Zamora	Gerardo Machado	1933
1933	Luciano López Ferrer		Niceto Alcalá Zamora	Ramón Grau San Martín	1936
1936	Domingo Barnés y Salinas		Manuel Azaña	Miguel Mariano Gómez	1937
1938	Carlos Montilla y Escudero	Chargé d'affaires	Francisco Franco	Federico Laredo Bru	
1938	Félix Gordón Ordás	ambassador commissed by the Second Spanish Republic with residence in Mexico City	Francisco Franco	Federico Laredo Bru	
1939	Miguel Espeliús y Pedroso	Chargé d'affaires Conde de Morales	Francisco Franco	Federico Laredo Bru	1942
1942	Pelayo García-Olay y Álvarez	Chargé d'affaires	Francisco Franco	Fulgencio Batista	1945
1945	Miguel Espeliús y Pedroso	Chargé d'affaires Conde de Morales	Francisco Franco	Ramón Grau San Martín	1946
1946	Álvaro Seminario y Martínez	Chargé d'affaires	Francisco Franco	Ramón Grau San Martín	1949
1948	Manuel Galán y Pacheco de Padilla	Chargé d'affaires	Francisco Franco	Carlos Prío Socarrás	1949
1949	Germán Baráibar y Usandizaga	Chargé d'affaires	Francisco Franco	Carlos Prío Socarrás	1952
1952	Juan Pablo de Lojendio e Irure	Chargé d'affaires	Francisco Franco	Fulgencio Batista	January 21, 1960
January 21, 1960	Eduardo Groizard y Paternina	Chargé d'affaires conde de Superunda (* January 30, 1890 † February 26, 1970 )	Francisco Franco	Osvaldo Dorticós Torrado	1961
1961	Jorge Taberna Latasa	Chargé d'affaires	Francisco Franco	Osvaldo Dorticós Torrado	1964
1964	Román Oyarzun Iñarra	Chargé d'affaires	Francisco Franco	Osvaldo Dorticós Torrado	1963
1969	Juan Torroba y Gómez-Acebo	Chargé d'affaires	Francisco Franco	Osvaldo Dorticós Torrado	1972
1972	Francisco Javier Oyarzun Iñarra	Chargé d'affaires	Francisco Franco	Osvaldo Dorticós Torrado	1975
1975	Enrique Suárez de Puga y Villegas		Carlos Arias Navarro	Osvaldo Dorticós Torrado	1979
May 19, 1979	Manuel Ortiz Sánchez		Adolfo Suárez	Fidel Castro Ruz	1981
August 3, 1981	Enrique Larroque de la Cruz		Leopoldo Calvo-Sotelo	Fidel Castro Ruz	1985
April 30, 1985	Antonio Serrano de Haro Medialdea		Felipe González	Fidel Castro Ruz	1990
August 31, 1990	Gumersindo Rico Rodríguez		Felipe González	Fidel Castro Ruz	1993
May 5, 1993	José Antonio San Gil Augustín		Felipe González	Fidel Castro Ruz	1994
April 8, 1995	Eudaldo Mirapeix		Felipe González	Fidel Castro Ruz	1996
October 19, 1996	José Coderch	the government of Cuba denied the placet to be ambassador	José María Aznar	Fidel Castro Ruz	
April 2, 1998	Eduardo Junco Bonet		José María Aznar	Fidel Castro Ruz	
April 6, 2001	Jesús Manuel Gracia Aldaz		José María Aznar	Fidel Castro Ruz	
July 9, 2004	Carlos Alonso Zaldívar		José Luis Rodríguez Zapatero	Fidel Castro Ruz	
October 17, 2008	Manuel Cacho Quesada		José Luis Rodríguez Zapatero	Raúl Castro	
May 11, 2012	Juan Francisco Montalbán Carrasco		Mariano Rajoy	Raúl Castro	
May 17, 2017	Juan José Buitrago de Benito		Mariano Rajoy	Raúl Castro	
October 1, 2018	Juan Fernández Trigo	Born in 1958, in Terrassa (Barcelona), he graduated in Law and entered the Diplomatic Career in 1986. He has been stationed in the diplomatic representations of Spain in Morocco, Vietnam, Cuba, European Communities, in Brussels, and before the UN, in New York. He has also been Deputy Director General of International Multilateral Economic Relations and of Air, Maritime and Terrestrial Cooperation and Ambassador of Spain in Haiti and in Paraguay.	Pedro Sánchez	Miguel Díaz-Canel	
