= Mary Tarrero-Serrano =

First Lady of Cuba (1924–2010)

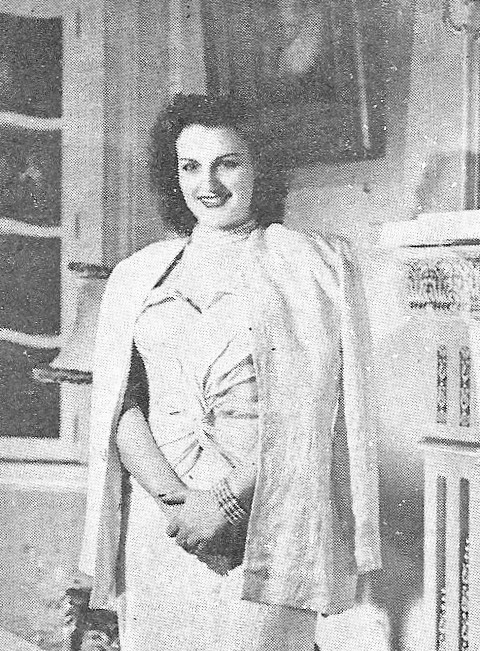

First Lady of Cuba
- In office 10 October 1948 – 10 March 1952
- President: Carlos Prío Socarrás
- Preceded by: Paulina Alsina Fernández
- Succeeded by: Marta Fernandez Miranda de Batista

Personal details
- Born: María Dolores Tarrero-Serrano; October 5, 1924 Camagüey Province, Cuba
- Died: September 23, 2010 (aged 85) Miami, Miami-Dade County, Florida, U.S.
- Party: Partido Auténtico
- Spouse: Carlos Prío Socarrás (m. 1945; died 1977)
- Relations: Carlos Prio-Touzet (stepson); Antonio Prío (brother-in-law); Maria Regla Prío (sister-in-law); Francisco Prío (brother-in-law)

María Dolores "Mary" Tarrero-Serrano de Prio (5 October 1924 – 24 September 2010) was a Cuban politician who was the First Lady of Cuba from 1948 to 1952. She was the second wife of Cuban President Carlos Prío Socarrás, who was overthrown by Fulgencio Batista in the 1952 Cuban coup d'état.

== Birth and early life ==
Terrero was born on the sugarcane mill "Pina" in eastern Camaguey. Her father, Gerardo Terrero, was the mill's accountant and her mother was Elvira Serrano. She and an older sister, Ana, studied stenography.

== Marriage and life as First Lady ==
While working in the Cuban Senate, she met her husband, who was a senator. They married on June 14, 1945, and they had two daughters, María Antonieta and María Elena. At the age of 24, she became the First Lady of Cuba. Their youngest daughter was born in the Presidential Palace. While she was the First Lady, Osvaldo Farrés, the composer of the song Quizas, Quizas, Quizas (Perhaps, Perhaps, Perhaps), composed the song Sensacion inspired by her.

== Exile and death ==
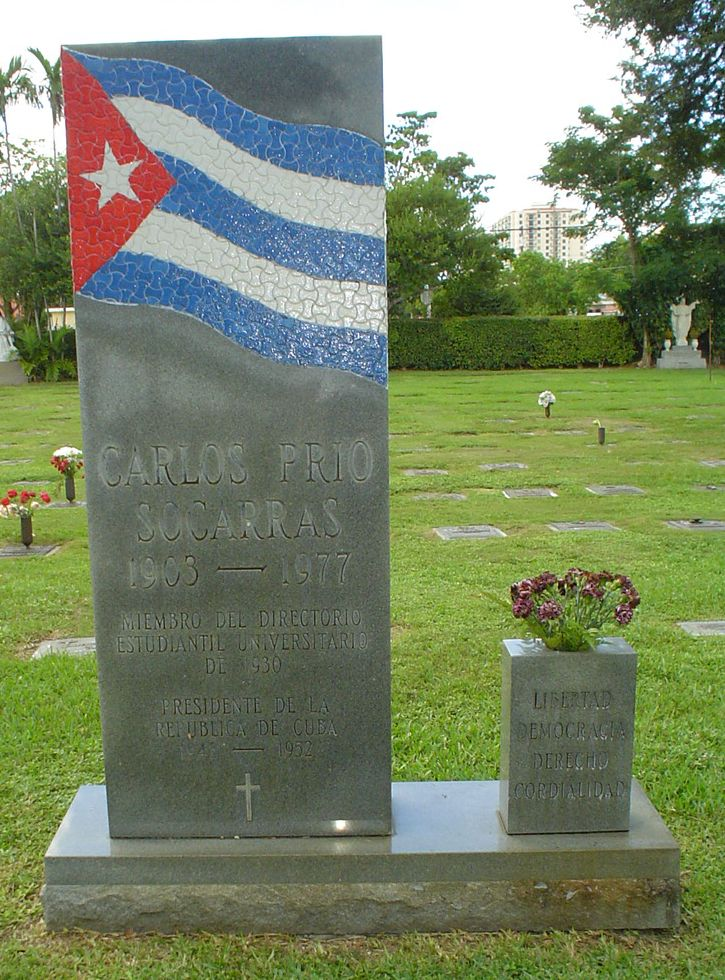
Carlos and Mary Prío's grave

She and her family went into their first exile in 1952. In 1956, after Batista granted an "amnesty", they returned for a short time until they were forced into exile again at gunpoint. After Batista was overthrown by the Cuban Revolution (which Prio supported financially). they returned to Cuba in January 1959. They went into their final exile in December 1960, when they realized that Fidel Castro's government had become a communist government. Her husband, the last constitutionally elected president of Cuba, committed suicide in 1977 and she died in 2010 of pneumonia. She and her husband, Carlos, are buried at Caballero Rivero Woodlawn North Park Cemetery and Mausoleum in Miami, Florida.
