= Timeline of the Cuban Revolution =

The Cuban Revolution was the overthrow of Fulgencio Batista's regime by the 26th of July Movement and the establishment of a new Cuban government led by Fidel Castro in 1959.

It began with the assault on the Moncada Barracks on 26 July 1953 and ended on 1 January 1959, when Batista was driven from the country and the cities Santa Clara and Santiago de Cuba were seized by revolutionaries, led by Che Guevara and Fidel Castro's surrogates Raúl Castro and Huber Matos, respectively.

However, the roots of the Cuban Revolution grows deep into the Cuban history and goes far back to the Cuban Independence Wars, in the last half of the nineteenth century and its consequences are still in motion in present day. Therefore, this is a timeline of the whole historical process that began on October 10, 1868, and it has not ended yet. Interventions by the United States, Russia, and other foreign powers are largely attributed to the state of Cuba today.

== Timeline ==
=== Before the Revolution ===
==== 1868-1878 ====
- 1868 October 11 Carlos Manuel de Céspedes and his followers begin the Ten Years War, first war of Cuban independence. According to the Cuban revolutionary ideologists, 1868 is the true beginning of the Cuban Revolution.
- 1869 April Guáimaro Assembly. Proclamation of the first independent Constitution of Cuba.
- 1873 May 11 Death of Major General Ignacio Agramonte.
- 1874 February 27 Death of Carlos Manuel de Céspedes.
- 1878 February 10 Signature of El Zanjón Pact. End of the Ten Years War.
- 1878 March 15 Protest of Baraguá, led by Major General Antonio Maceo. Failed attempts of continuing the war.

==== 1878-1895 ====
- The "Tregua Fecunda", a truce between the Spanish Colonial Government and the Cuban independence fighters (mambises).
- 1879-1880 The Little War, second war of Cuban independence. Another failed attempt of continuing the war.
- 1893 April José Martí regroups the Cubans and unites them into the Cuban Revolutionary Party, which also supports the fight for the independence of Puerto Rico.

==== 1895-1898 ====
- 1895 February 24 Beginning of the Cuban war of independence, third war of this kind.
- 1895 May 19 Death of José Martí.
- 1896 December 7 Death of Antonio Maceo.

==== 1898 ====
- The United States takes control of Cuba after Spain was defeated in the Spanish–American War and cedes all claims to the island.

==== 1898-1902 ====
- First US military occupation of Cuba.

==== 1902 ====
- May 20 Cuba declares independence although the country remains a US protectorate.

==== 1903 ====
- Guantanamo Bay Naval Base is established in the easternmost part of Cuba. Guantanamo bay is currently used to “interrogate” high-profile US detainees.

==== 1904–1932 ====
- U.S. companies bought millions of dollars' worth of Cuban land and Cuban banks, deepening U.S. control of the island.
- 1906-1917 The U.S. military intervened several times to put down coups, uprisings and facilitate elections.
- 1920-1921 Economic crisis due to the end of WWI.
- 1923 Protest of the Thirteen, led by Rubén Martínez Villena. Resurgence of the National Conscience.
- 1924 General Gerardo Machado wins the 1925 elections and becomes constitutional president of Cuba.
- 1925 The Communist Party of Cuba (now known as the Popular Socialist Party) was established.
- 1928 Machado is reelected and forms a much stronger government, with the pretension of stay in power at least until 1935, in violation of the Constitution. Machado is supported by the US government.
- 1929 Following the stock market crash, the price of sugar, a main export, falls. Economic strife fuels revolutionary fervor.
- 1930-1932 Beginning of a more decided way of resistance against General Machado's increasing repression against the people.

==== 1933 ====
- August 12 Machado was overthrown by a General Strike, led by the Communist Party, under Villena's control.
- US consul in Cuba names a new provisional president, Carlos Manuel de Céspedes y Quesada, son of the Founding Father, Carlos Manuel de Céspedes.
- September 4 A revolutionary junta led by Sergeant Fulgencio Batista seizes control of Cuba.
- September 10 Formation of the One Hundred Days Government, under the presidency of Dr. Ramón Grau San Martín.

==== 1934 ====
- January Colonel Batista overthrows President Grau and names a new government under his supervision, becoming the de facto ruler of Cuba. Villena dies of Tuberculosis.

==== 1935 ====
- March A new General Strike led by the Communist Party is defeated and massacred by Colonel Batista's troops.
- May Antonio Guiteras, one of the main leaders of the strike, is murdered in a fight against Batista's army.
- December Provisional President Carlos Mendieta resigns. José Agripino Barnet is named new President of Cuba.

==== 1936 ====
- May First Presidential elections since 1928. The winner is Miguel Mariano Gómez, who Batista worries will be too independent and resist his behind-the-scenes rule.
- December Under pressure from Batista and the army, Congress impeaches Gómez and removes him from office. Vice-president Federico Laredo Brú becomes the new president.

==== 1937-1938 ====
- Legalization of most of the political parties and an eventual end of the repression.

==== 1939-1940 ====
- Constitutional Assembly. Proclamation of the new Cuban Constitution.

==== 1942 ====
- The Cuban Communist Party was legalized.

==== 1945 ====
- October Cuba joins the United Nations.

==== 1947 ====
- The Orthodox Party was established by Eduardo Chibás. One of its members is young Law student Fidel Castro.

==== 1951 ====
- August Chibás commits suicide, but the Orthodox Party seems unstoppable. The next Presidential elections would be celebrated in June 1952.

==== 1952 ====
- March 10 General Batista organizes a Coup d'État, a few months before the elections and overthrows the corrupt government of President Carlos Prío.

=== During the Cuban Revolution ===
==== 1953 ====
- 26 July – Castro leads a group of 150 rebels in an attack against the Moncada barracks in Santiago de Cuba.
- 16 October – Fidel Castro makes "History Will Absolve Me" speech in his own defense against the charges brought on him after the attack on the Moncada Barracks.

==== 1954 ====
- 1954 September Che Guevara arrives in Mexico City.
- 1954 November Batista dissolves parliament and is elected constitutional president without opposition.

==== 1955 ====
- 1955 May Fidel and surviving members of his movement are released from prison under an amnesty from Batista.
- 1955 June Brothers Fidel and Raúl Castro are introduced to Che Guevara in Mexico City.

==== 1956 ====
- 1956 Nov 25 Fidel Castro, with some 80 insurgents including Raúl Castro, Che Guevara and Camilo Cienfuegos set sail from Mexico for Cuba on the yacht Granma.
- 1956 December 2 Granma lands in Oriente Province.

==== 1957 ====
- 1957 January 17, Castro's guerrillas score their first success by sacking an army outpost on the south coast, and started gaining followers in both Cuba and abroad.
- 1957 March 13, University students mount an unsuccessful attack on the Presidential Palace in Havana. Cuban revolutionary leader José Antonio Echeverría is killed in the streets of Havana by police.
- 1957 May 28, Castro's 26 July movement overwhelms an army post in El Uvero.
- 1957 July 30 Cuban revolutionary leader Frank País is killed in the streets of Santiago de Cuba by police while campaigning for the overthrow of Batista's government

==== 1958 ====
- 1958 February Raúl Castro opens a front in the Sierra de Cristal on Oriente's north coast.
- 1958 March 13 U.S. suspends shipments of arms to Batista's forces.
- 1958 March 17 Castro calls for a general revolt.
- 1958 April 9 a general strike, organized by the 26th of July movement, is partially observed.
- 1958 May Batista sends an army of 10,000 into the Sierra Maestra to destroy Castro's 300 armed guerrillas. By August, the rebels had defeated the army's advance and captured a huge amount of arms.
- 1958 November 1 A Cuban aircraft en route from Miami to Havana is hijacked by militants but crashes. The hijackers were trying to land at Sierra Cristal in Eastern Cuba to deliver weapons to Raúl Castro's rebels. It is the first of what was to become many Cuba-U.S. hijackings
- 1958 December Guevara directs a rebel attack on Santa Clara
- 1958 December 28 Guevara's guerrilla troops seize Santa Clara.
- 1958 December 31 Camilo Cienfuegos leads revolutionary guerrillas to victory in Yaguajay.

==== 1959 ====
- 1959 January 1 Batista steps down and a civilian government takes control.
- 1959 January 1 The Cuban revolutionaries call a General Strike to ensure governmental control
- 1959 January 2 Che Guevara's and Camilo Cienfuegos' troops arrive on Havana.
- 1959 January 5 Manuel Urrutia is named President of Cuba.
- 1959 January 8 Fidel arrives in Havana.

=== After the Revolution ===
==== 1959 ====
- January–February Many members of the Batista regime are judged, sentenced and executed by the new government. Many of these trials were held in stadiums with executions shortly after trial, with the accused denied legal counsel.
- February 16 Fidel Castro is named Prime Minister of Cuba, in substitution of José Miró Cardona.
- May 17 Fidel Castro signed the First Law of Agrarian Reform, giving new lands for the Cuban peasants who didn't have any.
- July Failed attempt of invasion by the Dominican Republic's dictator Rafael Leonidas Trujillo. Manuel Urrutia is replaced as president by the communist lawyer Osvaldo Dorticós.
- September–October Major Huber Matos unsuccessfully attempts to rise up his troops in Camagüey province, but he is arrested by Major Camilo Cienfuegos, who mysteriously disappears on October 28. December Raúl Roa becomes the new Chancellor of Cuba.

==== 1960 ====
- March 6 La Coubre cargo ship carrying ammunition and explosives explodes in Havana Bay, killing over 100 people. Fidel Castro accuses the CIA of orchestrating this without providing any proof. A few days later, Photographer Alberto Korda makes the famous Che Guevara picture during the memorial service for the victims of the explosion.
- Many private companies are nationalized by the Revolutionary Government. Those who opposed the Revolutionary Government, began to flee the island, mostly to Florida. Some others, formed guerrilla groups in the forests and mountains. In the meanwhile, Cuba formed an alliance with the Soviet Union, at the peak of the Cold War.
- October Majors William Morgan and Jesús Carreras are arrested for conspiracy.

==== 1961 ====
- March Former Majors William Morgan and Jesús Carreras are executed for high treason.
- April Fidel Castro officially proclaims that "Cuba is a socialist country". The Bay of Pigs' invasion is defeated, being captured 1.197 of the 1.500 Cubans who invaded the island supported by the US Government. Former Mayor Humberto Sorí Marín is executed for attempt on sabotage.
- December 22 Fidel Castro officially proclaims that Cuba is a "Country without alphabets".

==== 1962 ====
- Becomes more and more obvious that the US Government will invade Cuba with its army, so the Cuban Revolutionary Government ask for Soviet help.
- October Cuban Missile Crisis: The world on the brink of nuclear war.

==== 1963 ====
- Second Law of Agrarian Reform is signed by the Revolutionary Government. Hurricane Flora destroyed the East of the country.

==== 1964 ====
- The attempts of Cuban Minister of Industries, Major Che Guevara, of industrializing the country failed.

==== 1965 ====
- January Former Major Eloy Gutiérrez Menoyo is captured while attempting to form a new group to sabotage the economy of Cuba.
- March Che Guevara leaves Cuba and goes to Congo, planning to start a new revolution there.
- The last remains of anti-communist guerrilla groups are definitely defeated.

==== 1966-1967 ====
- Che Guevara secretly returns to Cuba with the intention of marching to Bolivia, planning to start a new revolution there. He and most of his men were killed in Bolivia.

==== 1966-1980 ====
- "Sovietization" of the Cuban Revolution. Repression against writers, actors, musicians, rockers, homosexuals, and anyone who follows the American Pop Culture. Standardization of the way of dressing and the hair style, etc.
- 1973 August 6 Fulgencio Batista dies of a "heart attack" in Spain, where he had lived the remainder of his life in exile.
- 1975-1976 Constitutional Assembly.
- 1976 February 24 Proclamation of the new Cuban Socialist Constitution.
- 1976 December Fidel Castro is elected the new President of Cuba.
- 1977-1978 Cuban military intervention in Ethiopia.
- 1980 April–October Mariel Exodus.

==== 1981-1989 ====
- Economic "Golden Age" of the Cuban Revolution. Partial "liberalization" of the country. Cuban military interventions in Angola and Nicaragua.
- 1985 Mikhail Gorbachev takes power in the Soviet Union.
- 1989 General Ochoa's trials.

==== 1990-On ====
- 1990-1994 The "Special Period": Collapse of the Soviet Union and the Cuban economy. Rafters' Crisis.
- 1995-1999 Partial economic recovery and further "liberalization".

==== 2000 ====
- Fidel Castro proclaims the "Battle of Ideas", a new way of doing things and recovering the country's economic situation.

==== 2001 ====
- November Hurricane Michelle affected the country.

==== 2002 ====
- April Cuba fully supports Venezuelan President Hugo Chávez during the attempt of Coup d'État on his government.
- September–October Hurricanes Isidore and Lili affected the country.

==== 2003 ====
- March–April Cuba prepares for a probable invasion by US troops, after the US invasion of Iraq.

==== 2004 ====
- Hurricane Ivan affected the country.

==== 2005 ====
- Beginning of the "Energetic Revolution", some sort of green revolution in Cuba.
- September Hurricane Wilma affected the country.

==== 2006 ====
- July Fidel Castro leaves power temporarily in his Vice-president's hands, General Raúl Castro.

==== 2008 ====
- February 24 Raúl Castro becomes officially the new President of Cuba.
- August–September Hurricanes Gustav, Ike and Paloma affected the country.

==== 2009 ====
- March Resignation of Vice-president Carlos Lage and Chancellor Felipe Pérez Roque, due to a scandal of corruption.

==== 2010 ====
- The Cuban Revolutionary Government decides to create two new provinces for the country: Artemisa and Mayabeque.

==== 2011 ====
- April Raúl Castro succeeds Fidel Castro as First Secretary of the Communist Party of Cuba, making him the de facto leader of Cuba.
- April Raúl Castro impulsed the "Actualization of the Economic and Social Model", similar of what China and Vietnam have done since the 1980s.
- July President of Venezuela Hugo Chávez is operate for the first time, due to his cancer.

==== 2012 ====
- Hurricane Sandy affected the country.
- December President of Venezuela Hugo Chávez goes to Cuba to be operated again.

==== 2013 ====
- March President of Venezuela Hugo Chávez dies and is succeeded by his Vice-president Nicolás Maduro, with the full support of the Cuban Government.
- December Presidents Raúl Castro and Barack Obama shake their hands in Nelson Mandela's funeral, commencing the negotiations between both nations to normalize relationships.

==== 2014-2017 ====
- Cuban Thaw: Two and a half years of relatively normal relationships between Cuba and the US.
- 2016 October Hurricane Matthew affected the country.
- 2016 November 25 Death of Fidel Castro.
- 2017 June American President Donald Trump puts an end to the Cuban Thaw.
- 2017 September Hurricane Irma affected the country.

==== 2018 ====
- April 19 Miguel Díaz-Canel becomes the new President of Cuba.
- October 10 President Díaz-Canel and General Raúl Castro celebrated the beginning of the Cuban Revolution, 150 years ago (1868).

==== 2019 ====
- February 24 National Referendum of the new Cuban Constitution.
- April 10 Proclamation of the new Cuban Constitution.

==== 2021 ====
- April 19 Miguel Díaz-Canel is elected First Secretary of the Communist Party of Cuba, succeeding Raúl Castro.

== Sources ==
Cuba: Timeline of a revolution by Al Jazeera English
