= Caballero Rivero Woodlawn Park North Cemetery and Mausoleum =

Cemetery in Miami, Florida, United States

Coordinates: 25°45′53″N 80°14′55″W

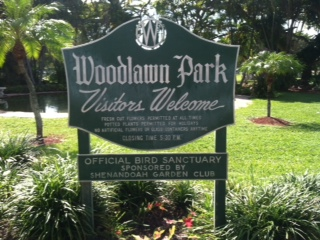
Woodlawn Park North Cemetery

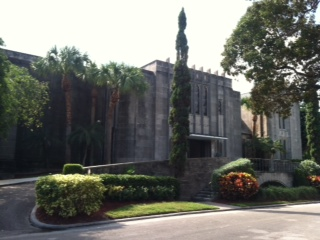
Woodlawn Park North Mausoleum

Caballero Rivero Woodlawn Park North Cemetery and Mausoleum is one of the oldest cemeteries in Miami, Florida. Woodlawn Park Cemetery–North was established in 1913 by three pioneers in Miami's early history – Thomas O. Wilson, William N. Urmey and Clifton D. Benson. The Woodlawn group of cemeteries grew throughout the years, and funeral homes were added as well. The founders imported rare tropical trees and shrubs to adorn the cemetery, including the first schefflera (umbrella trees) and mahogany trees brought to the United States.

== History ==
In 1923 Woodlawn provided a large plot at a discounted price to the American Legion in order to bury veterans who might not have the means to buy plots for themselves. The Legion commissioned an obelisk and statues to honor service members.

Woodlawn Park in 1926 commissioned a noted mausoleum architect, McDonald Lovell, to design a mausoleum for the park. The present building covers more than a city block, accented with marble, stained glass, and hand-wrought bronze gates.

The cemetery contains 13 British Commonwealth war graves of World War II, comprising one British and two New Zealand airmen, and ten Royal Navy personnel.

In 1990, Caballero Funeral Homes (established in 1857 in Havana, Cuba) joined Woodlawn Park Cemeteries and Funeral Home. In 1993, Rivero Funeral Homes (established in 1946 in Havana, Cuba), the largest funeral home business in Florida, was also acquired and the name changed at that time to Caballero Rivero Woodlawn North Park Cemetery and Mausoleum.

Caballero Rivero Woodlawn North Park Cemetery and Mausoleum is located at 3260 SW 8th St, Miami FL 33135, on SW 8 Street, between 32 and 33 Avenue.

== Notable burials ==
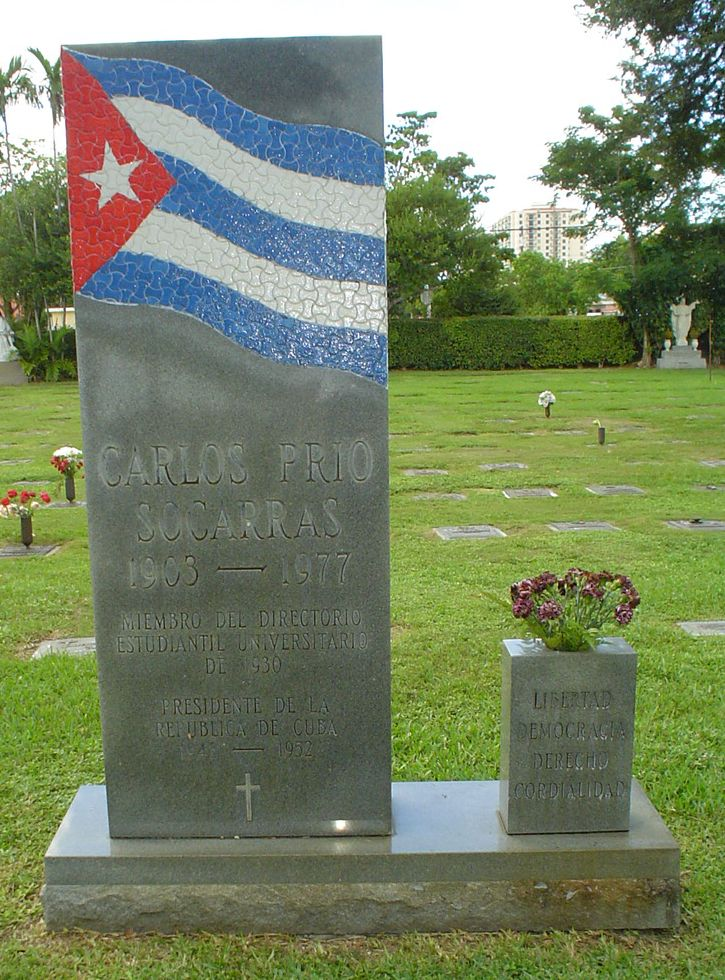
Grave of Carlos Prío Socarrás and Mary Prío.

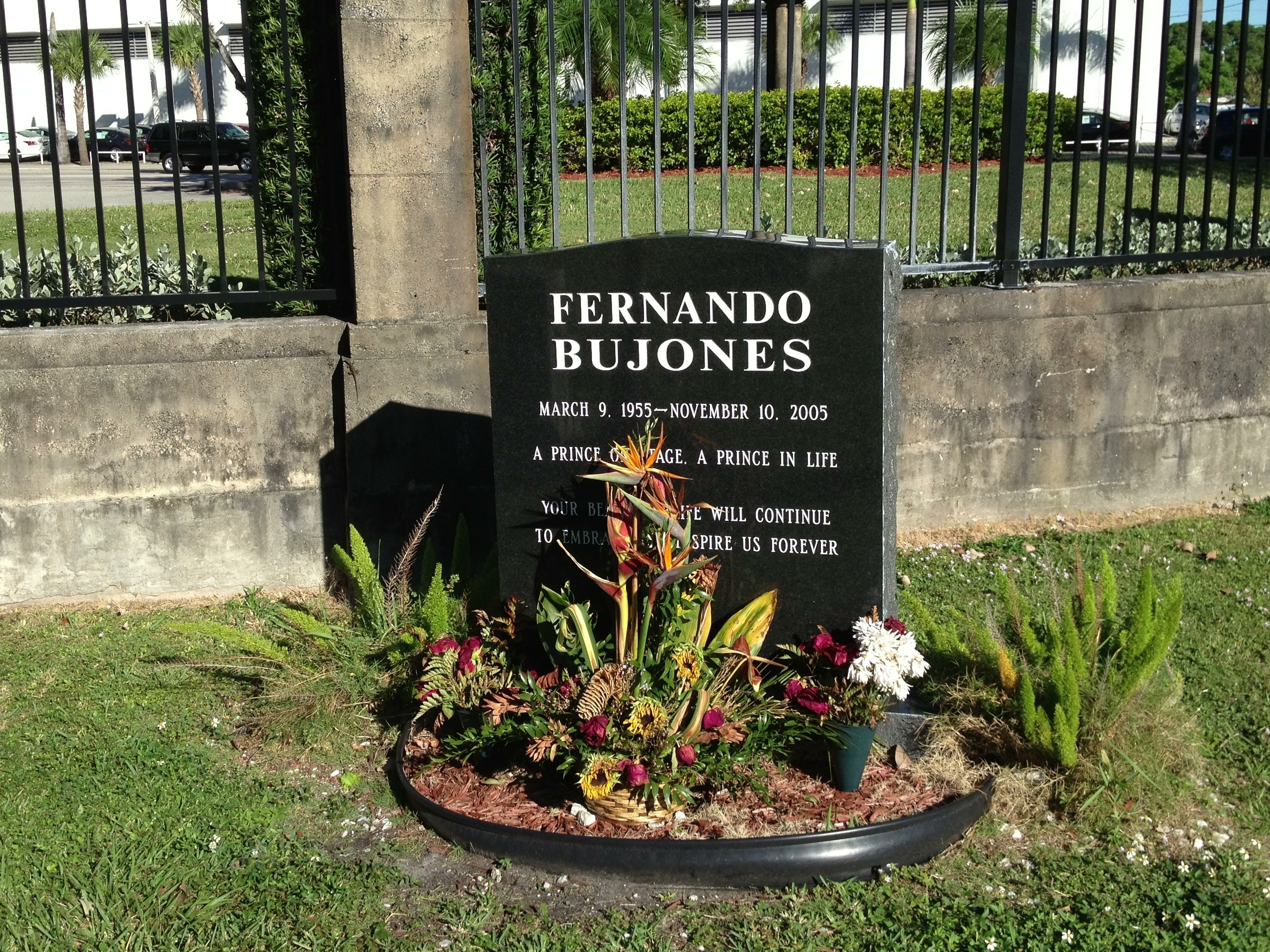
Ballet dancer Fernando Bujones

- Desiderio Alberto Arnaz II – youngest mayor of Santiago de Cuba, former Representative of Cuba and father of Desi Arnaz
- Sandy Amorós – Professional Baseball player
- Manuel Artime – led the Bay of Pigs invasion
- José Miguel Battle Sr. – Cuban gangster and Bay of Pigs veteran.
- Lydia Cabrera – Cuban ethnographer, writer, and literary activist
- William Brickell and his wife, Mary – one of the founders of Miami
- Fernando Bujones – Ballet dancer
- Pat Cannon – former U.S. Representative
- Max Carey – Baseball Hall of Famer
- Andres Domingo y Morales del Castillo former president of Cuba
- Dixie Dunbar – Singer and Actress
- Rafael Guas Inclan – former Vice President of Cuba.
- Matthew Gribble – Olympic swimmer.
- Mike de la Hoz – Professional Baseball player
- Estelle Avinger Haggard (1884–1977), President General of the United Daughters of the Confederacy
- Doris Hart – Tennis Hall of Famer
- George Kenney – USA general during World War II
- William C. Lantaff – former U.S. Representative
- Gerardo Machado y Morales – former President of Cuba
- Jorge Mas Canosa – Cuban-American activist
- George Merrick – Founder of Coral Gables and the University of Miami
- José Carlos Millás - Director del Observatorio Nacional de Cuba
- Kirk Munroe – American writer
- Mary Barr Munroe – clubwoman, conservationist
- Antonio Prío Socarrás – former minister of Cuba
- Perrine Palmer Jr -Miami Mayor
- Carlos Prío Socarrás – former President of Cuba
- María Dolores "Mary" Tarrero-Serrano – former First Lady of Cuba, wife of Carlos Prío Socarrás
- Francisco Prío Socarrás – former Senator of Cuba
- Maria Regla Prío Socarrás – former Representative of Cuba
- Antonio Prohias – cartoonist who created the comic strip Spy vs. Spy for MAD Magazine
- Manolo Reyes – pioneering Spanish-language news broadcaster
- Ramon Santamaria – Grammy Hall of Famer
- Hope Portocarrero – former First Lady of Nicaragua
- Anastasio Somoza Debayle – former President of Nicaragua
- Alfonso, Prince of Asturias (1907–1938), Count of Covadonga, entombed there from (1938–1985)
- James Mark Wilcox – former U.S Representative
