= América Arias =

Cuban philanthropist and benefactor

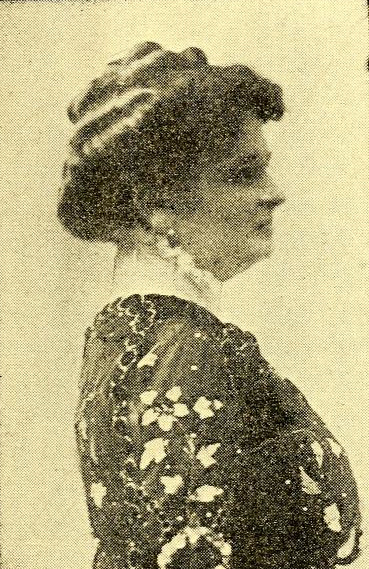

First Lady of Cuba
- In office January 28, 1909 – May 20, 1913
- President: José Miguel Gómez
- Preceded by: Genoveva Guardiola de Estrada Palma
- Succeeded by: Mariana Seva de Menocal

Personal details
- Born: América Arias López; October 6, 1857 Sancti Spíritus, Spanish Cuba
- Died: April 20, 1935 (aged 77) Havana, Republic of Cuba
- Spouse: José Miguel Gómez (died 1921)
- Children: Miguel Mariano Gómez

América Arias López (October 6, 1857 – April 23, 1935), also known as América Arias de Gómez, was a Cuban philanthropist and benefactor, known for her charitable initiatives, as well as her support for various organizations and publications in Cuba. Arias was the second First Lady of Cuba from 1909 to 1913 as the wife of President José Miguel Gómez. She was a prominent, early supporter of the Cuban independence movement and served as a messenger and nurse during the Little War with the rank of captain.

== Biography ==
Arias was born on October 6, 1857, in Sancti Spíritus, Cuba, into a wealthy family. She was an early supporter of the Cuban independence movement. Arias provided material supplies and support to pro-independence fighters, as well as to ordinary Cuban families facing hardships due to the crackdowns by the Spanish colonial government during the wars of independence. Arias served as a military messenger and nurse during the Little War from 1879 to 1880, earning her the rank of captain. She shared the goal of Cuban independence with her husband, José Miguel Gómez, whom she married at a young age. José Miguel Gómez, a commander of the Ejército Mambí and veteran of the Ten Years' War against Spanish rule, served as the second President of Cuba from 1909 until 1913. Their son, Miguel Mariano Gómez, later became Mayor of Havana in 1926 and president of Cuba in 1936.

Throughout her life, Arias focused on charitable works, becoming a notable benefactor in the country. She was considered a model of humility, altruism and charity. Together with other prominent Cuban women of the time, Arias supported the construction of the Church of Our Lady of Charity, the patron saint of Cuba. Arias successfully convinced the director of Bohemia magazine to help fundraise for the church. In 1913, her request to name the new church in honor of Our Lady of Charity was approved by Pope Pius X, earning praise from the Catholic writer Martín Leiseca and members of the Cuban media.

Arias was the first honorary president of the National Association of Nurses of the Republic of Cuba, which was founded in 1909, and worked to recognize the role of nurses in the country. She also supported several magazines and other publications, including Brisas de Yayabo (1911–1913), a magazine published in Havana, but focused specifically on her hometown of Sancti Spíritus. Arias was also the honorary director of América magazine, which had been named in her honor by editor-in-chief Clara Moreda Luis, who founded the publication on April 28, 1929.

Arias' husband, former President José Miguel Gómez, died in 1921. América Arias died in Havana on April 23, 1935, at the age of 77.

=== Legacy ===
In her lifetime, El Vedado Maternity Hospital in Havana was renamed in her honor. The hospital, an art deco building opened in 1930, was originally named for Elvira Machado, the then-first lady and wife of President Gerardo Machado. Following Machado's ouster in the Cuban Revolution of 1933, Havana Mayor Miguel Mariano Gómez renamed the hospital in honor of his mother. The hospital helped poor and single women in Havana.

There are several monuments and streets named in Arias' honor in Havana and other cities around the country. In February 2002, the Office of the Historian of the City of Havana unveiled a bust of America Arias, designed by sculptor Juan Salvador. The bust in located in front of the Granma Memorial in Old Havana.
