= Genoveva Guardiola de Estrada Palma =

Honduran-Cuban school director and First Lady of Cuba

Genoveva Guardiola Arbizú

First Lady of Cuba
- In office 20 May 1902 – 28 September 1906
- President: Tomás Estrada Palma
- Preceded by: Office created
- Succeeded by: América Arias

Personal details
- Born: María Genoveva de Jesús Guardiola Arbizú; 30 July 1858 Comayagua, Honduras
- Died: 30 December 1926 (aged 68) New York City, New York
- Spouse: Tomás Estrada Palma (m. 1881; died 1908)
- Occupation: School Director
- Known for: Inaugural First Lady of independent Cuba

María Genoveva de Jesús Guardiola Arbizú, known as Genoveva Guardiola Arbizú, Genoveva Guardiola de Estrada Palma, or popularly Veva, (30 July 1858 – 30 December 1926) was the Honduran-born wife of the first President of Cuba, Tomás Estrada Palma, when the country gained its independence from Spain, and the inaugural First Lady of Cuba from 1902 to 1906. Raised in Honduras, she moved with her husband to the United States in 1882 and assisted him with the bi-lingual school he established in Central Valley, New York. When her husband was elected as the first president of Cuba, after the country gained independence from Spain, she served as the inaugural First Lady. During her husband's second term in office, he resigned and she moved with him to the Cuban countryside to run an agricultural estate. Upon his death, she returned to the United States. Her image was depicted on a 1956 postage stamp issued by the Honduran Postal Service.

== Early life ==
María Genoveva de Jesús Guardiola Arbizú, called Veva, was born on 30 July 1858, in Comayagua, Honduras to Ana Mateo Arbizú Flores and Honduran President José Santos Guardiola Bustillo. In 1878, she met Tomás Estrada Palma, who had been invited to come to Honduras and serve as postmaster general. Estrada, a Cuban national, was a participant in the independence struggle of Cuba from Spain and was arrested and sent to prison in Spain in 1877, he was released and sent to the United States. Estrada, took up residence with his cousin, the poet José Joaquín Palma in Tegucigalpa, across the street from the widow Arbizú de Guardiola and her five daughters. The widow often hosted musical evenings with her daughter, Galatea playing the piano. A romance developed between 45-year-old Estrada and 23-year-old Veva and they were married on 15 May 1881 and had their first child, José Manuel, the following year. The band of Cuban exiles who had been living in Honduras began going their separate ways at this time, and the young family left the country in 1882, settling in Central Valley, New York.

== Career ==
Arriving in New York, Estrada (Note: American newspaper sources at the time, typically referred to the couple as Palma, even though some sources did try to point out that their actual surname was Estrada.) found backers and began a Spanish language/English language school, the Estrada Palma Institute. The school taught primarily Argentine, Cuban, Honduran and Mexican immigrants, but also had American students. Estrada ran the school and Guardiola took care of their growing family, which included Tomas Jr. (born ca. 1884), Candelaria (born ca. 1888), twins Carlos and Luz (born ca. 1894) and Raphael (born ca. 1896). Because Estrada was near New York City, where José Martí was continuing activities to gain Cuban independence from Spain, Estrada was often absent, consulting with Martí. When Martí was killed in 1895, Estrada became the leader of the independence movement, leaving Guardiola to manage their affairs in Central Valley. At the end of the war in 1899, Estrada returned to the Central Valley to take over the reins of the school from his wife. Through encouragement of other generals in the war, Estrada was convinced to run for President of Cuba in the 1901 election. Despite his long residence in New York, he was elected, and Guardiola became the inaugural first lady of an independent Cuba.

Accompanying Estrada to Cuba, the family attended his inauguration on 20 May 1902 and Guardiola hosted a massive ball with around 2,000 guests on 13 November 1902. Unless needed for state functions, Guardiola and the family lived separately at a residence in Cambria, a neighborhood two blocks from the Presidential Palace, where Estrada worked daily except on Sundays. He was elected for a second term of office in 1905 and served until his resignation on 28 September 1906. On 2 October 1906, the family left Havana by boat headed to Matanzas. They remained in Matanzas until mid-1907, when the family relocated to eastern Cuba to a farm Estrada owned in Bayamo. Selling the home in Central Valley, the entire family worked on the Valmar Plantation, with Guardiola and the daughters doing domestic chores, while the sons managed the farm production. Near the end of 1908, Estrada developed pneumonia and died on 4 November. Guardiola returned to the United States after his death.

== Death and legacy ==
De Estrada Palma died on 30 December 1926, New York City, New York. Her image was depicted on a 1956 postage stamp issued by the Honduran Postal Service.
