= Lis Cuesta Peraza =

First Lady of Cuba (born 1971)

Her Excellency Lis Cuesta Peraza
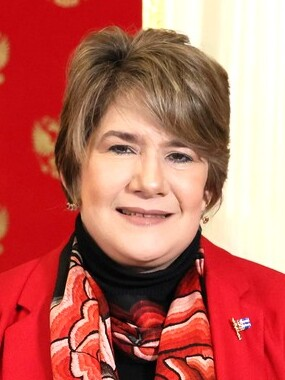
- Cuesta in 2024

First Lady of Cuba
- Incumbent
- Assumed role 19 April 2018
- President: Miguel Díaz-Canel
- Preceded by: Vilma Espín (de facto, 2007)

Second Lady of Cuba
- In office 24 February 2015 – 19 April 2018
- Vice President: Miguel Díaz-Canel
- Preceded by: Position established
- Succeeded by: Julia Piloto Saborit

Personal details
- Born: 28 March 1971 (age 55) Holguín, Oriente, Cuba
- Party: Communist Party of Cuba (2009–present)
- Spouse: Miguel Díaz-Canel (m. 2009)
- Children: 2
- Education: University of Holguín
- Occupation: Politician
- Profession: Tourism Executive
- Nickname: La Machi

Lis Cuesta Peraza de Díaz-Canel (née Cuesta Peraza; born 28 March 1971) is a Cuban politician and former tourism executive who is the current First Lady of Cuba since 2018 as the second wife of Miguel Díaz-Canel, the First Secretary of the Communist Party and President of Cuba. Cuesta is the first woman to be called "first lady" by Cuban state-run media since the 1960s.

== Personal life ==
Cuesta Peraza is married to Miguel Díaz-Canel, for whom she is his second wife. She has two children from a previous relationship. One of her children, Manuel Anido Cuesta, received significant coverage in November 2024 after reportedly dating Cuban actress Ana de Armas, which resulted in de Armas receiving significant criticism among members of the Cuban diaspora.
