= Manuel Márquez Sterling =

Interim President of Cuba in 1934

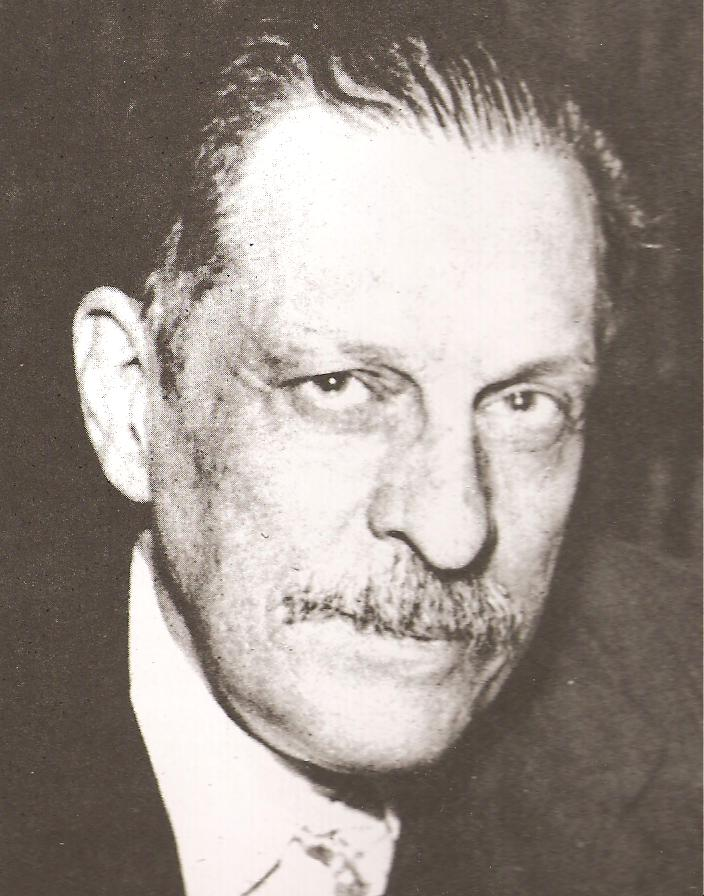

President of Cuba Interim
- In office 18 January 1934 (6 hours)
- Vice President: None
- Preceded by: Carlos Hevia (Interim)
- Succeeded by: Carlos Mendieta (Interim)

Personal details
- Born: August 28, 1872 Lima, Peru
- Died: December 9, 1934 (aged 62) Washington, D.C., United States
- Party: Liberal Party of Cuba
- Spouse: Mercedes Márquez Sterling y Ziburo

Manuel Márquez-Sterling (born Carlos Manuel Agustín Márquez-Sterling y Loret de Mola on August 28, 1872 in Lima, Peru – December 9, 1934, Washington, DC, United States) was a Cuban diplomat and interim President of Cuba for 6 hours on January 18, 1934. In an article published by Bohemia in December, 1934 (as a result of his death) he is credited with saving the life of Mexican President Francisco I. Madero, when the latter was hiding from the authorities of then Mexican President Porfirio Diaz, during the initial states of the Mexican Revolution.

He served in the Cuban War of Liberation and went to Washington in 1901 as member of the Cuban mission to protest the Platt Amendment. After a journalistic career he served in diplomatic service for many years. He resigned as Ambassador to Mexico in 1932 after differences with Machado. He later became ambassador to the United States under the presidency of Carlos Manuel de Cespedes y Quesada, acted as Cuban representative under Grau's presidency and also acted as Cuban ambassador under Mendieta's presidency.

He was married to his cousin, Mercedes Márquez Sterling y Ziburo. He was the uncle of Carlos Márquez Sterling, a figure in Cuban politics whom he adopted as his son.

He tied for 16-17th in the Paris 1900 chess tournament (Emanuel Lasker won) played during the world exhibition.

== Chess patronage ==
Márquez Sterling financed the San Sebastián international tournaments of 1911 and 1912 (organised by Jacques Mieses), appearing in contemporary chess publications under the pseudonym "M. Marquet". He was instrumental in ensuring José Raúl Capablanca's participation in the 1911 event over the objections of several established masters; Capablanca won the tournament.

Political offices
Preceded by Carlos Hevia	President of Cuba; Interim; January 18, 1934 (6 hours)	Succeeded by Carlos Mendieta
Preceded by Carlos Saladrigas	Foreign Minister of Cuba; 1933-1934	Succeeded by Cosme de la Torriente y Peraza
