= María Regla Prío =

Cuban politician

Maria Regla Prío Socarrás
- Born: October 11, 1909; Cuba
- Died: December 2005 (aged 96); Miami, Florida, U.S.

María Regla Prío Socarrás (October 11, 1909 in Cuba – December 2005 in Miami, Florida USA) was a member of the Cuban House of Representatives (1948–1952) and the sister of Cuban President, Carlos Prío Socarrás.

She was married to Dr. Enrique C. Henriquez Lauranzon. She is buried in Woodlawn Park Cemetery and Mausoleum (now Caballero Rivero Woodlawn North Park Cemetery and Mausoleum) in Miami, Florida.
