= Antonio Prío =

Cuban politician (1905–1990)

Antonio Prío Socarrás
- Born: June 29, 1905; Cuba
- Died: September 6, 1990 (aged 85); Miami, Florida USA

Antonio Prío Socarrás (June 29, 1905 – September 6, 1990) was a Cuban banker and minister of housing (1948–1950), and minister of finance during the presidency of his brother Cuban President, Carlos Prío Socarrás.

In 1950, he ran for Mayor of Havana but lost to the incumbent, Nicolás Castellanos. He was married to Rosario Páez (1906–1988) and they had three daughters, Rosario Zoé, Esperanza Socarrás and Ileana Prío Páez. He is buried in Woodlawn Park Cemetery and Mausoleum (now Caballero Rivero Woodlawn North Park Cemetery and Mausoleum) in Miami, Florida.
