= Marta Fernández Miranda de Batista =

First Lady of Cuba (1917–2006)

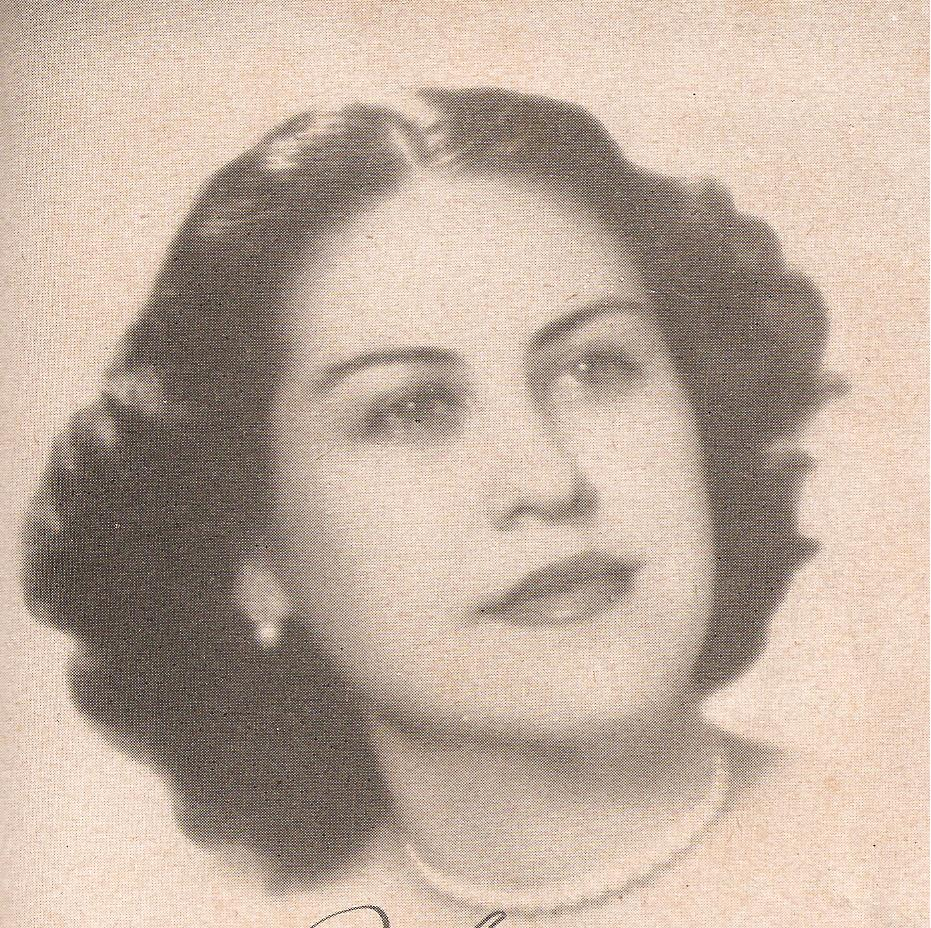
- Fernández in 1953

First Lady of Cuba
- In office March 10, 1952 – January 1, 1959
- President: Fulgencio Batista
- Preceded by: María Dolores "Mary" Tarrero-Serrano
- Succeeded by: none

Personal details
- Born: Marta Fernández Miranda; November 11, 1917 Cuba
- Died: October 2, 2006 (aged 88) West Palm Beach, Florida, U.S.
- Spouse: Fulgencio Batista (m. 1945; died 1973)

Marta Fernández Miranda de Batista (née Fernández Miranda; November 11, 1917 – October 2, 2006), also known as "Marta del Pueblo" (Spanish for 'Marta of the People'), was First Lady of Cuba from 1952 until 1959 as the second wife of Cuban president and dictator Fulgencio Batista, who was overthrown by Fidel Castro in the Cuban Revolution, which forced the couple to flee permanently into exile.

== First Lady ==
Fulgencio Batista had already been Cuban President once, from 1940 to 1944. Following his divorce from his first wife in October 1945, he married Marta Fernández Miranda on November 28, 1945. The couple met when Marta was 20 years old and riding a bicycle through a Havana neighborhood and Batista's motorcade accidentally forced her off the road. Impressed by her beauty, Batista took her as a mistress but later decided to leave his first wife and marry Marta. They moved to the United States during the 1940s after Batista's choice for his successor lost the presidential election in 1944. They had originally wanted to live in Palm Beach, Florida, but were shunned by the Palm Beach community. They rented a car and began driving north on U.S. Route 1 along the Florida coast. After arriving in Daytona Beach at the end of the day, they liked the reception they received there. They hired a real estate agent the next day and purchased a large riverfront house, where they lived on and off while continuing to influence Cuban politics.

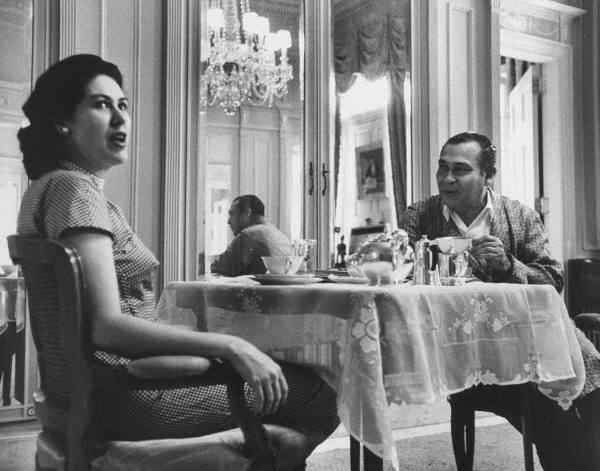
At breakfast with Fulgencio Batista in the Presidential Palace, 1958.

Batista ran for and won a seat in the Cuban Senate in absentia in 1948. On March 10, 1952, Batista staged his second coup and once again became president of Cuba. This made Marta Fernández de Batista the new First Lady of the country.

Marta Fernández de Batista became an important matron of the Cuban arts as First Lady. She convinced her husband to have the National Gallery built, which is now known as the Museo Nacional de Bellas Artes de La Habana (National Museum of Fine Arts of Havana). The couple started acquiring colonial era Cuban and modern paintings for the Gallery.

== Exile ==
Fulgencio and Marta, their children and close friends fled Cuba in three planes on January 1, 1959, to escape Fidel Castro's forces. Critics have accused them of taking as much as 700 million U.S. dollars in fine art and cash with them as they fled into exile.

After being denied entry into the United States, the couple went to the Dominican Republic before moving on to Portugal, and eventually Spain. Fulgencio Batista died in Spain of a heart attack in 1973, after fourteen years in exile. In his will, he bequeathed his home in Daytona Beach and his art collection there to the city. The Batista home was briefly used as a museum, before being sold by the city in 1971, whereupon it was converted to a church.

== Later life ==
Following her husband's death Marta Fernández de Batista moved to West Palm Beach, Florida in the United States. She lived a quiet life in her home in the Palm Beach area during her later years, often giving to a number of medical charities. A major contributor to the Jackson Memorial Hospital in Miami, she purchased inscribed bricks at the hospital as part of a fundraiser. Batista's son Roberto later said in an interview that, "She was very private, almost reclusive, after my father died. She had a gift for charity, but she did it very privately."

== Death ==
Marta's health began to decline after undergoing hip surgery in 1995. She died of Alzheimer's disease at her home in West Palm Beach on October 2, 2006, at the age of 88.

Marta was survived by four children whom she had with Fulgencio Batista (three sons and one daughter): Jorge Luis, Roberto Francisco, Fulgencio Jose and Marta Malouf Batista. Another son, Carlos Manuel, had died in 1969 of leukemia.

Marta's funeral was held at St. Juliana Catholic Church in West Palm Beach, Florida and she was buried in Madrid, Spain, in the cemetery of La Almudena, along with her husband and son.
