= Vilma Espín =

Cuban revolutionary and politician (1930–2007)

Vilma Espín Guillois
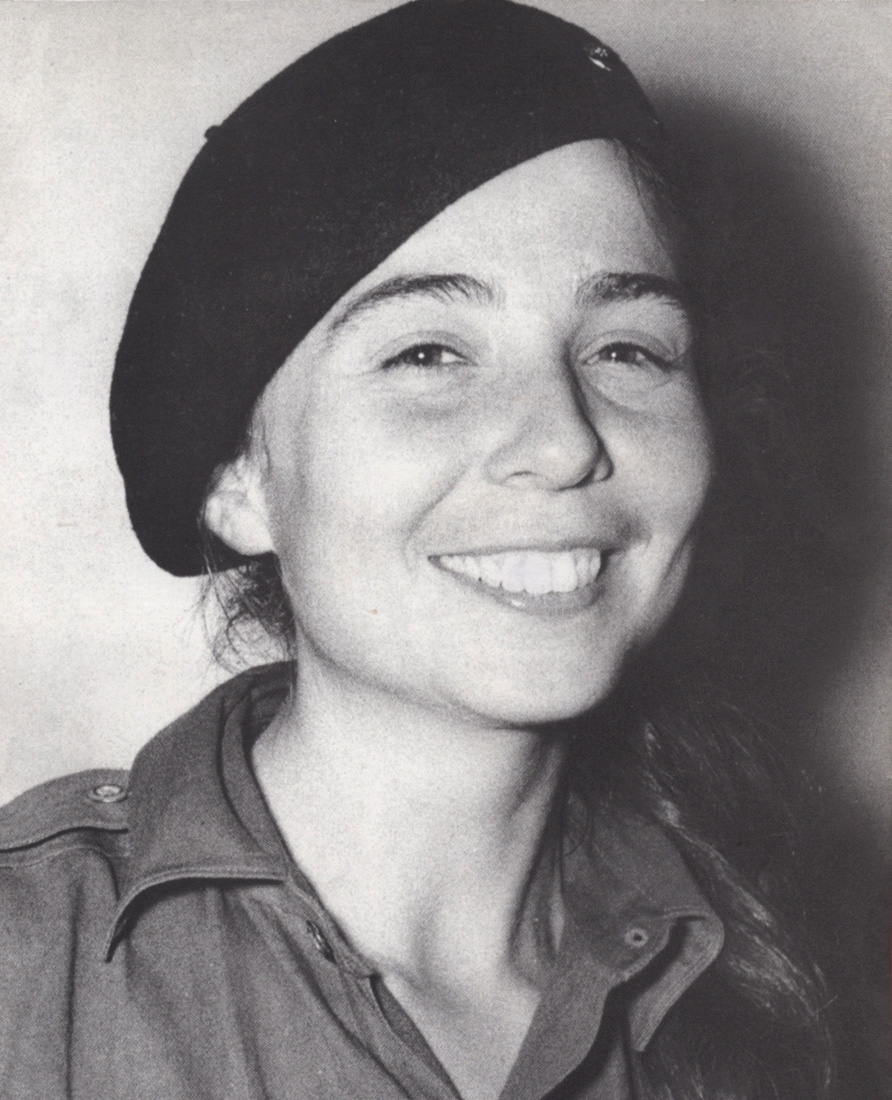
- Espín c. 1958

First Lady of Cuba
- In role 2 December 1976 – 18 June 2007; De facto 16 February 1959 – 2 December 1976
- Leader: Fidel Castro; Raúl Castro
- Preceded by: María de la Caridad Molina
- Succeeded by: Lis Cuesta Peraza (2018)

President of the Federation of Cuban Women
- In office 23 August 1960 – 18 June 2007
- Succeeded by: Yolanda Ferrer Gómez as General Secretary

Other office held: Member of the National Assembly of People's Power; Member of the Central Committee of the Communist Party of Cuba; Secretary of State

Personal details
- Born: Vilma Lucila Espín Guillois; 7 April 1930 Santiago de Cuba, Oriente, Republic of Cuba
- Died: 18 June 2007 (aged 77) Havana, Cuba
- Spouse: Raúl Castro (m. 1959)
- Children: 4, including Mariela and Alejandro
- Education: Massachusetts Institute of Technology
- Awards: Lenin Peace Prize (1977–78)

Vilma Lucila Espín Guillois (Spanish pronunciation: [ˈbilma esˈpin]; 7 April 1930 – 18 June 2007) was a Cuban revolutionary, feminist, and chemical engineer. She helped supply and organize the 26th of July Movement as an underground spy, and took an active role in many branches of the Cuban government from the conclusion of the revolution to her death. Espín helped found the Federation of Cuban Women and promoted equal rights for Cuban women in all spheres of life.

As the wife of Raúl Castro and the sister-in-law of Fidel Castro, she was essentially the First Lady of Cuba for about 45 years.

== Early life and education ==
Vilma Espín Guillois was born on 7 April 1930, in Santiago de Cuba. She was the daughter of a wealthy Cuban lawyer, Jose Espín and wife Margarita Guillois. She had four siblings, Nilsa, Iván, Sonia and José. Espín attended Academia Pérez-Peña for primary school and studied ballet and singing at the Asociación Pro-Arte Cubano during the 1940s. In the 1950s, she studied chemical engineering at Universidad de Oriente, Santiago de Cuba (one of the first women in Cuba to study this subject). While attending college at the Universidad de Oriente, Santiago de Cuba, she played volleyball, tennis, and was a soprano in the University Choir. While in college, Espin also met her mentor, Frank Pais, in a university group called the Oriente Revolutionary Action (ARO), which was responsible for the assault on the Moncada barracks. After graduating, her father encouraged her to attend MIT in Cambridge, Massachusetts to complete her post-graduate studies in the hopes that visiting America would dissuade her from becoming involved in socialist activity. When she finally acquiesced, her brief academic career at MIT left her with even more animosity toward the United States, as she officially joined the 26th of July Movement on her way back to Cuba through Mexico. Espin only completed one semester at MIT.

== Role in the Cuban revolution ==
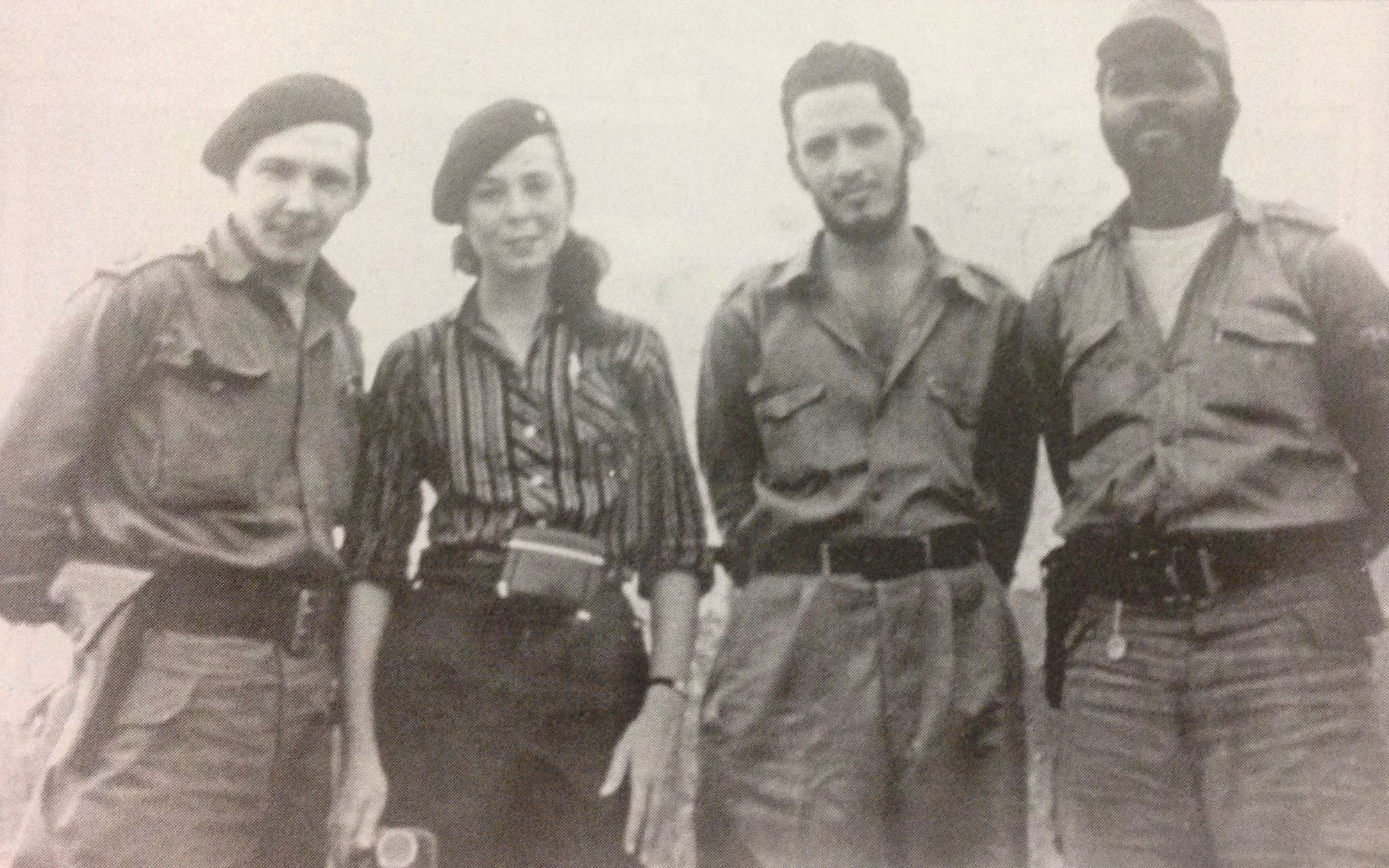
Raúl Castro, Vilma Espín, Jorge Risquet and José Nivaldo Causse (1958)

Returning home, she became more involved with the opposition to the dictator Fulgencio Batista. A meeting with revolutionary leader Frank País led her to become a leader of the revolutionary movement in Oriente province. Espín met the Castro brothers who had relocated to Mexico after their failed armed attack on the Moncada Barracks in July 1953 and release from prison in 1955. Espin acted as a messenger between the Julio 26 Movement in Mexico and Pais back in Cuba. She then went on to assist the revolutionaries in the Sierra Maestra mountains after the 26th of July Movement's return to Cuba on the Granma yacht in November 1956.

Espín's ability to speak both Spanish and English allowed her to represent the revolutionary movement on an international scale. Pepín Bosch, an executive of the Bacardi Corporation, arranged a meeting between CIA Inspector General Lyman Kirkpatrick and representatives of the 26th of July Movement in 1957. Espín, as both a revolutionary leader and the daughter of a Bacardi executive, told Kirkpatrick that the revolutionaries only wanted "what you Americans have: clean politics and a clean police system." She also acted as an interpreter for an interview of Fidel Castro by New York Times reporter Herbert Matthews in 1957, which served the dual purpose of spreading news of the revolution and assuring Cubans and the international community that Batista's claims of Castro's death were false.

== Role in the Federation of Cuban Women ==
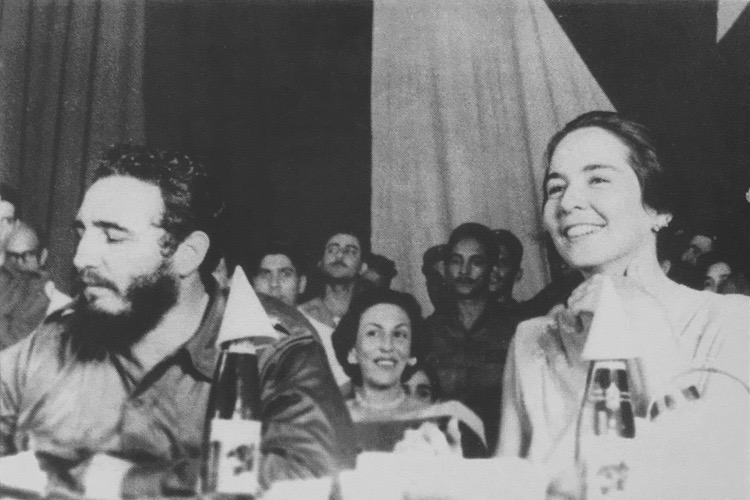
Espín and Fidel Castro during the formation of the Federation of Cuban Women, August 1960

Vilma Espín was an outspoken supporter of gender equality in Cuba, but distinctly separated herself and the goals of the Federation of Cuban Women from traditional feminism, insisting on advocacy for causes that were 'feminine' as opposed to 'feminist'. Her involvement in the revolution helped transform the role of women in Cuba and in 1960, Espín became the president of the Federation of Cuban Women, and remained in that position until her death in 2007. The organization's primary goals were educating women, giving them the necessary skills to seek gainful employment, and above all, encouraging them to participate in politics and to support the revolutionary government. In 1960, when sugar mills and cane fields were under attack across Cuba shortly before the Bay of Pigs invasion, the Federation of Cuban Women created the Emergency Medical Response Brigades to mobilize women against counter-revolution. The Cuban government and the Federation encouraged women to join the labor force, even going so far as to pass the Cuban Family Code in 1975, a law mandating that men must help with household chores and childcare to lighten the workload for working mothers.

== Role in the Cuban government ==
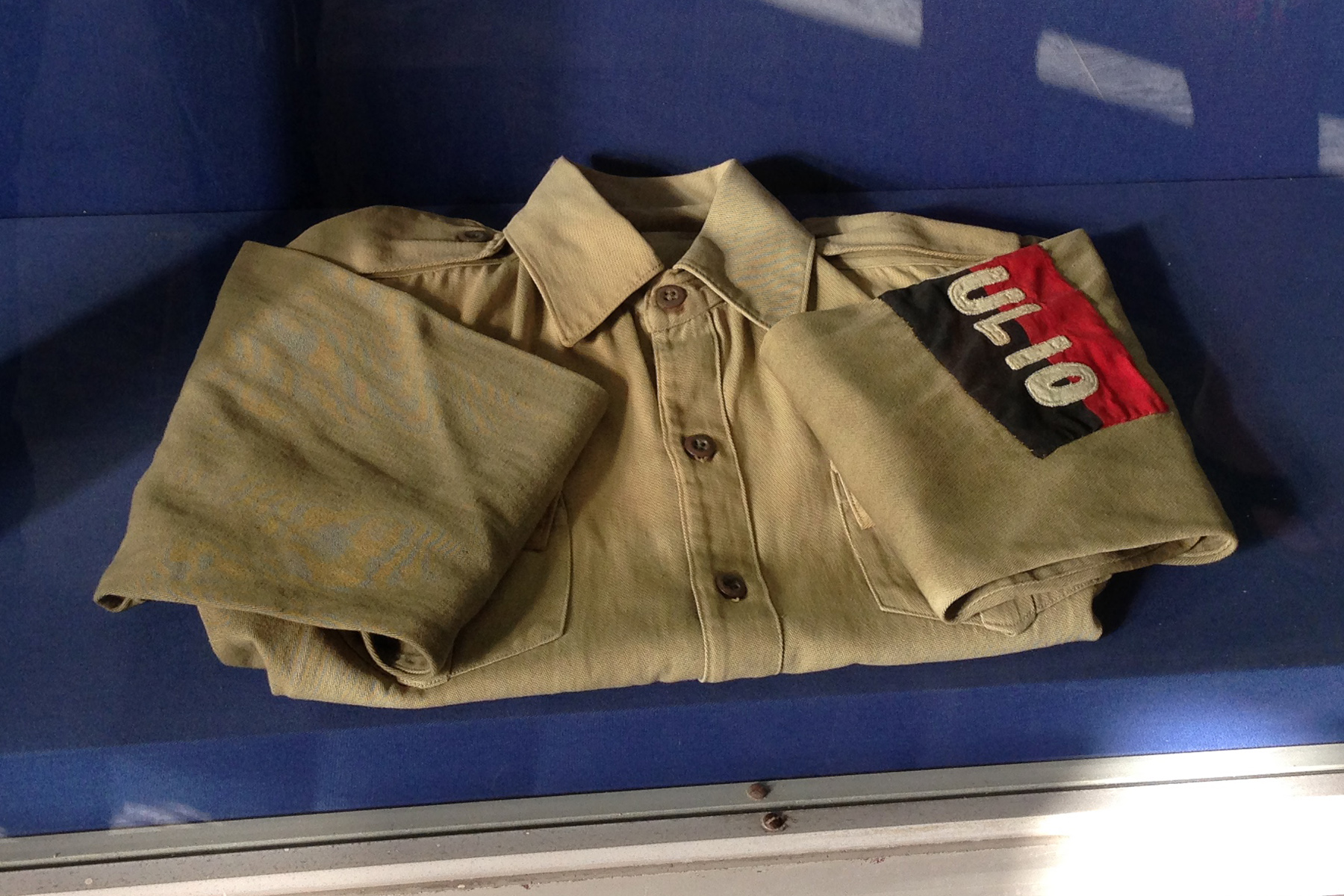
Espín's guerrilla uniform

Espín served as a member of the Central Committee of the Cuban Communist Party from 1965 to 1989. She also held many other roles in the Cuban government, including chair of the Commission for Social Prevention from 1967 to 1971, director of Industrial Development in the Ministry of Food in 1969, president of the Institute of Childcare in 1971, and member of the Cuban Council of State in 1976. In addition to her roles within Cuba, Espín also served as Cuba's representative at the United Nations General Assembly.

Espín took on the role of Cuba's First Lady for 45 years, initially taking on the role as the sister-in-law to Fidel Castro, who was divorced at the time he came to power. She officially became the First Lady in 2006 when her husband, Raúl Castro, became president. Additionally, she was granted the title of "Secretary of State" in the Government of Cuba.

Espín headed the Cuban Delegation to the Congress of the International Federation of Democratic Women in Chile in September 1959. She also headed the Cuban delegations to subsequent Conferences on Women, praising them as "invaluable to women in developing countries."

== Family ==
Espín was married to Raúl Castro, the former First Secretary of the Communist Party of Cuba, who is the brother to former First Secretary Fidel Castro. Their wedding took place in 1959, only weeks after the 26th of July Movement had successfully overthrown dictator Fulgencio Batista. She had four children (Deborah, Mariela, Nilsa, and Alejandro Castro Espín) and eight grandchildren. Her daughter, Mariela Castro, currently heads the Cuban National Center for Sex Education, and her son, Alejandro Castro Espín, is a Colonel in the Ministry of Interior.

== Death and legacy ==
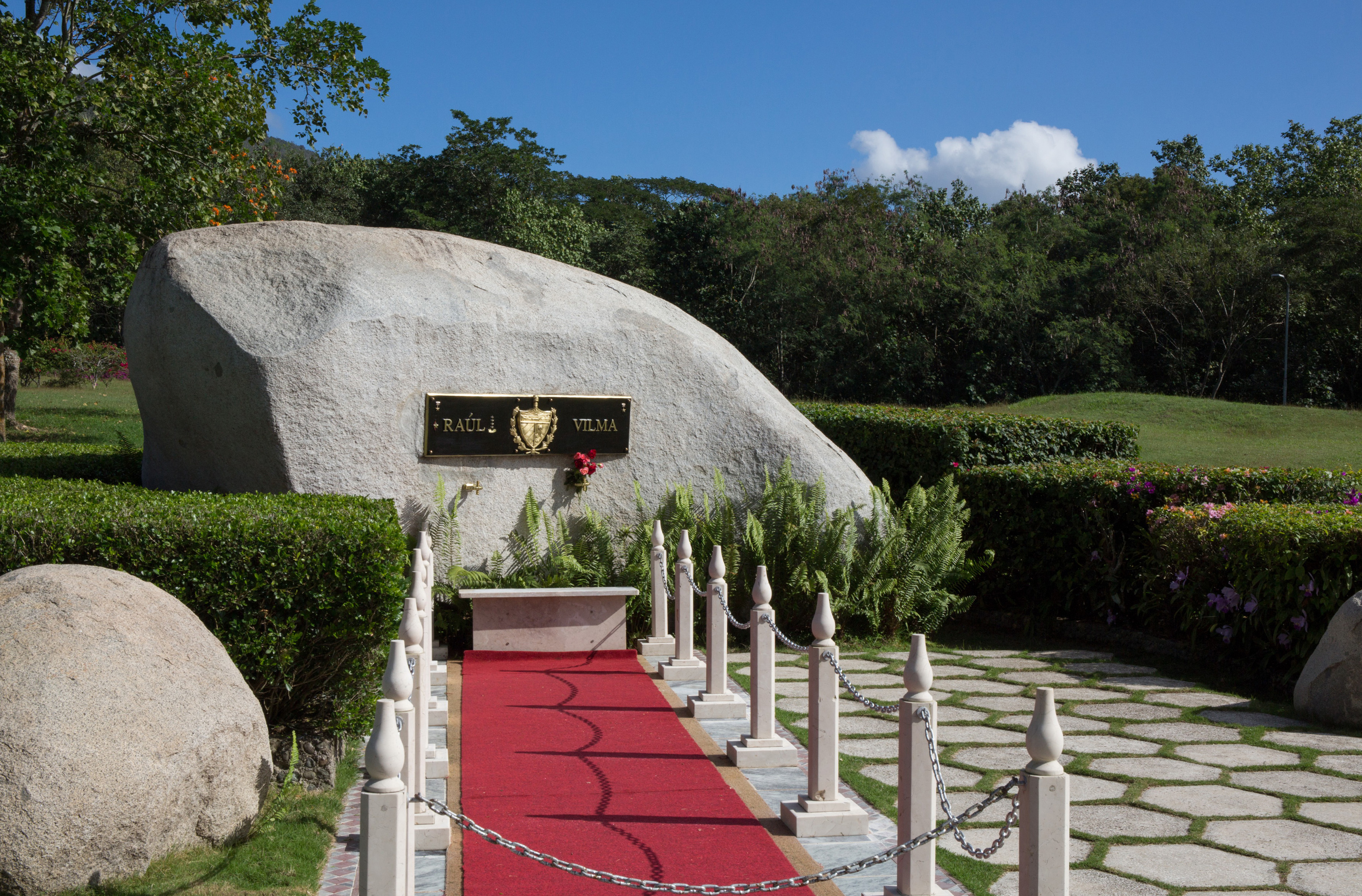
Tomb of Vilma Espín

Espín died in Havana at 4:14 p.m. EDT on 18 June 2007, following a long illness. An official mourning-period was declared from 8 p.m. on 18 June until 10 p.m. on 19 June. A funeral ceremony was held at the Karl Marx Theatre in Havana the day after her death. Thousands of Cubans paid their respects in a receiving line at the Plaza of the Revolution in Havana. Raúl Castro was in the receiving line, but Fidel Castro was not present. The Cuban government released a statement praising her as "one of the most relevant fighters for women's emancipation in our country and in the world." Her body was cremated, and her remains rest in the Frank País Mausoleum, Municipio II Frente in the province of Santiago de Cuba, Cuba. The Vilma Espín elementary school was opened in Havana in April 2013. Espin founded the Frente Continental de Mujeres Contra la Intervención (Continental Women’s Front Against Intervention, FCMCI) and the Regional Center of the International Democratic Federation of Women for the Americas and Caribbean.
