= Federico Laredo Brú =

President of Cuba from 1936 to 1940

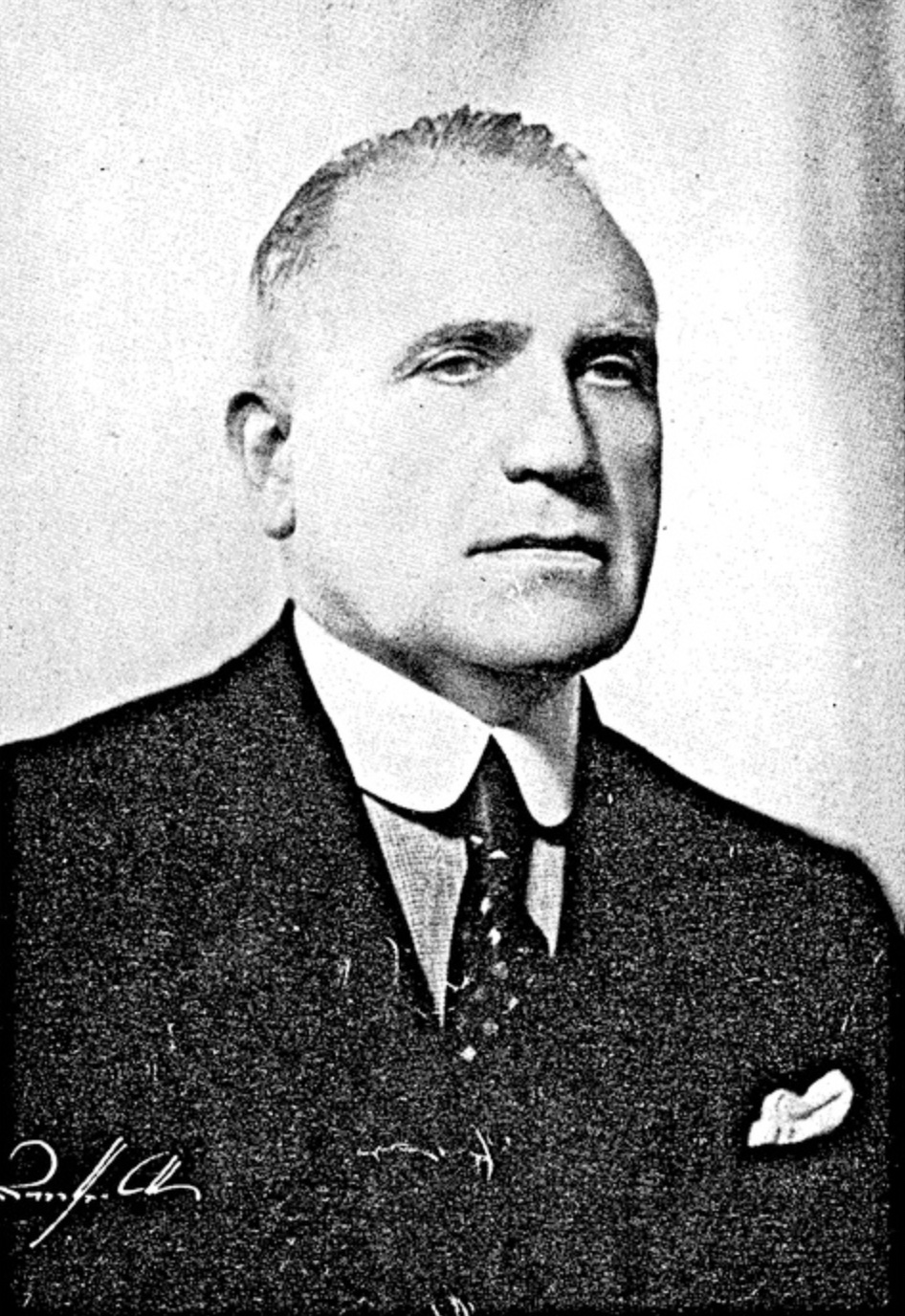

8th President of Cuba
- In office December 24, 1936 – October 10, 1940
- Preceded by: Miguel M. Gómez
- Succeeded by: Fulgencio Batista

Personal details
- Born: April 23, 1875 Remedios, Spanish Cuba
- Died: July 7, 1946 (aged 71) Havana, Republic of Cuba
- Party: Unión Nacionalista
- Other political affiliations: Partido Auténtico; Liberal Party of Cuba
- Spouse: Leonor Gomez-Montes

Federico Laredo Brú (Spanish: [feðeˈɾiko laˈɾeðo ˈβɾu]; April 23, 1875 – July 7, 1946) was an attorney and served as President of Cuba from 1936 to 1940. He was married to Leonor Gomez-Montes. Laredo Bru was a Colonel in the Cuban Liberation Army during the Cuban War of Independence.

== Rise to power ==
Laredo Brú's rise to power began on May 20, 1936 as Vice President. When Miguel Mariano Gómez, son of former president José Miguel Gómez, won the 1936 presidential election, strongman Fulgencio Batista engineered the impeachment of Gómez in December 1936 for having vetoed a bill to create rural schools under army control. Federico Laredo Brú served the concluding years of Gómez' term leading the way for an ambitious Batista.

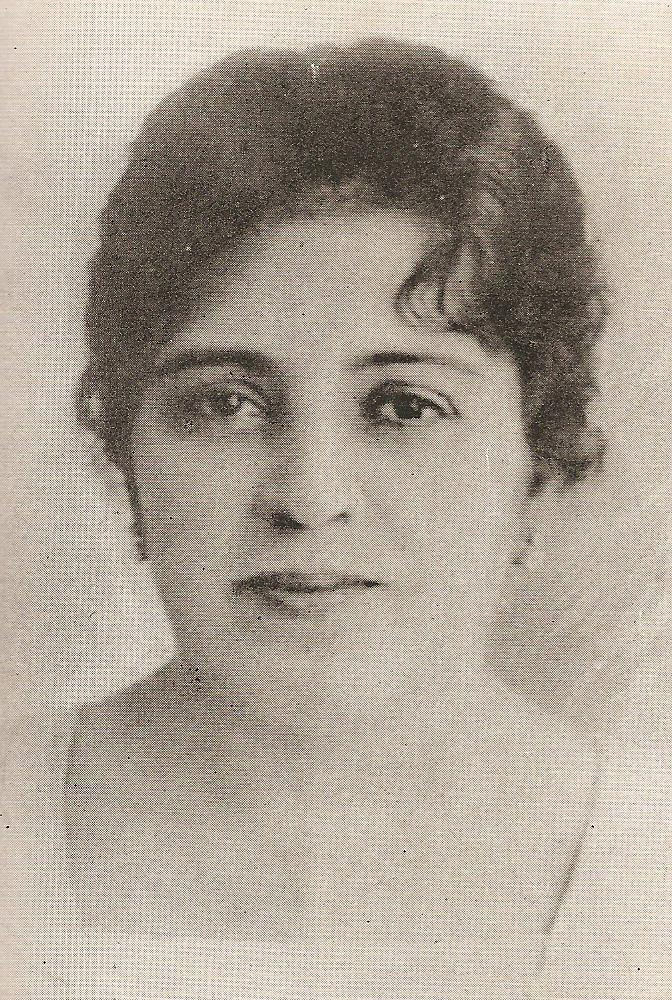
Leonor Gómez-Montes de Laredo Brú, First Lady of Cuba.

== Social and economic programs ==
Under Federico Laredo Brú, amnesties were granted including to the brutal, former dictator Gerardo Machado and the Cuban Congress passed many social welfare measures as well as laws creating pensions, insurance, minimum wages, and limited working hours.

In 1937 Laredo Brú pushed for the passage of the Law of Sugar Coordination which organized small farmers into cooperatives and unionized agricultural workers, guaranteed tenant farmers a share of their crop and that they were not to be deprived of their fields if they worked them.

Laredo Brú also issued a decree that stated all businesses should be headed by Cuban nationals. Workers unionized, particularly into the Confederation of Cuban Workers, a union in which Communists had substantial influence.

== Cuban-U.S. relations ==
Though the United States had been a dominant force in Cuban politics since 1898 causing anti-American sentiment among the educated, the U.S. presence was lessened under Brú.

== MS St. Louis ==
On May 27, 1939, the ocean liner MS St. Louis arrived, carrying 930 Jewish refugees from Hamburg, Germany fleeing Hitler's persecutions, and was refused permission to land by Laredo Brú. Cuban government-issued landing certificates held by the passengers had been invalidated by Laredo Brú's government during their transit. Two persons attempted suicide and dozens more threatened to do the same. Ultimately, only 22 Jewish refugees, 4 Spaniards and 2 Cuban nationals were permitted to disembark at Havana and the ship, having likewise failed to enter the U.S. and Canada, ultimately disembarked its remaining passengers in England, France, Belgium and the Netherlands.

== Death ==
Former president Laredo Brú died of a heart malady in Havana at the age of seventy-one.
