= José Miguel Gómez =

President of Cuba from 1909 to 1913

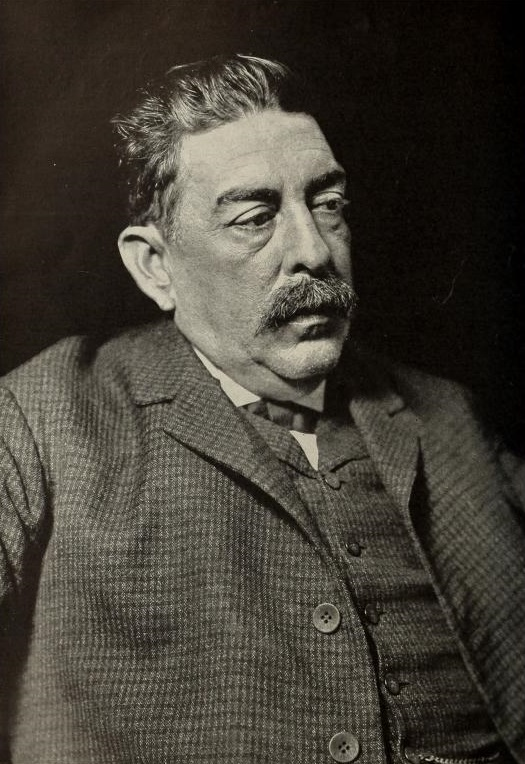
- Gómez in 1909

2nd President of Cuba
- In office 28 January 1909 – 20 May 1913
- Vice President: Alfredo Zayas
- Preceded by: Tomás Estrada Palma
- Succeeded by: Mario García Menocal

Personal details
- Born: 6 July 1858 Sancti Spíritus, Spanish Cuba
- Died: 13 June 1921 (aged 62) New York City, New York, U.S.
- Party: Liberal Party of Cuba
- Spouse: América Arias
- Children: Miguel Mariano Gómez

José Miguel Gómez y Gómez (Latin American Spanish: [xoˈse miˈɣel ˈɣomes i ˈaɾjas]; 6 July 1858 – 13 June 1921) was a Cuban politician and revolutionary who was one of the leaders of the rebel forces in the Cuban War of Independence. He later served as President of Cuba from 1909 to 1913.

== Early career ==
At the Constitutional Convention, Gómez was one of those who voted in favor of adopting the Platt Amendment. Born in Sancti Spíritus, in the former Las Villas Province, Gómez went on to govern Santa Clara and became quite popular in Cuba. In 1905, Gómez planned to run for the presidency with Alfredo Zayas on behalf of the Liberals. Violence prevented the Liberals from winning much in the election so Gómez dropped out of the running.

Gómez and Zayas began to split the Liberal party. A strong showing by the Conservatives against the divided Liberals convinced them to rejoin.

== Term in office ==
Gómez and Zayas won the 1908 election as the candidates for the Liberal Party. He was very well liked among the people and Gómez was also viewed as a kind president in the eyes of the people. However, political corruption boomed during his presidency and several major scandals occurred.

During his presidency the government also began funding newspapers, influencing them towards pro-government positions. On 9 September 1909 President Gomez signed a decree establishing the Cuban Telephone Company, an U.S. based company having a highly dominant control of the telecommunications market of Cuba at the time and many years in the future. He earned the nickname of "Tiburon" (lit. 'The Shark'; "when he swims, he splashes") in reference to the fact that he shared and handed out many public offices and posts to friends and relatives.

According to U.S. Consul in 1911 the value of U.S. nationals resident in Cuba was estimated at being $205 million (in 1911 U.S. dollars). The raising and final sinking of the USS Maine in the Straits of Florida were accomplished during Gomez' administration. President Gomez also had to confront with severe agitations and protests of various associations or organizations of Veterans of the Cuban War of Independence. Part of the agitation stemmed from the Veterans protesting the holding of public or civil office by Cubans or Spaniards who defended or “bore arms for the Spanish cause” during Cuba's War of Independence.

In 1912, conflict between Afro-Cuban rebels and the armed forces of Cuba took place mainly in the eastern region of the island where most Afro-Cubans were employed. After a widespread massacre of Afro-Cubans by the Cuban Army and the intervention by the U.S. military the rebellion was brought to an end in a matter of weeks.

On 18 June 1912, President Gomez issued a decree granting a forestry privilege/right to the Compania de Agricultura de Zapata, which decreed corresponded to the large Zapata Swamp in southern Matanzas. Apparently, U.S. Ambassador of Cuba at the time, Arthur M. Beaupre, made a fuss of the incident and the U.S. government sent a note to the Cuban government disapproving of such decree. Weeks later on 13 August 1912, President Gomez suspended his decree.

Under his administration, Gomez promoted the development of the Navy. The cruiser “Cuba” was made, and the vessel “Patria” among others, was commissioned.

Throughout his administration, Gomez and/or the Cuban Congress at the time undertook various actions which included: (1) the establishment of diplomatic legations in Chile, Argentina, Brazil, Uruguay, Norway, Germany and the Netherlands, (2) the legalization of cockfighting, (3) the establishment of the National Lottery, which was a great source of government revenue, (4) the founding of the Banco Territorial de Cuba, (5) the onset of pharmaceutical regulation, (6) the creation of multiple municipalities throughout the island. Probably one of his greatest achievements was not seeking re-election during the 1912 Cuban general election. It is said that the ghost of Tomas Estrada Palma's actions in seeking re-election during the 1905 Cuban general election may have played a role in Gomez' decision not to seek re-election

== Later life ==
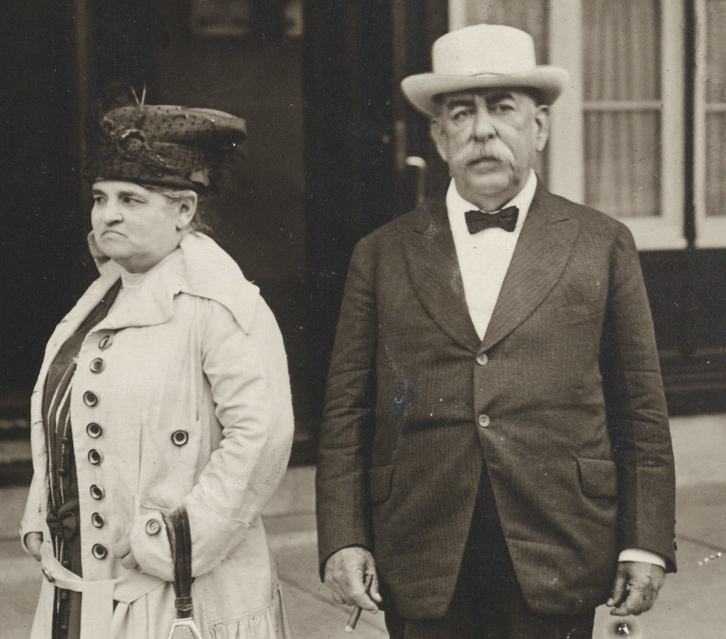
Jose Miguel Gomez, c. 1918

Following the highly contested, and allegedly fraudulent, 1916 Cuban general election Gomez rose up in revolt against President Menocal in 1917. The rebellion was quashed, and Gomez would be captured and placed under house arrest. Gomez would be released under an amnesty bill in March 1918. He ran for President unsuccessfully during the 1920 Cuban general election. Following his defeat, he sought the assistance of the U.S. and met directly with U.S. Secretary of State Charles Evans Hughes on 16 April 1921 in Washington D.C. in attempts to seek “justice” or a new election or any other measure that would help his cause. The U.S. was unwilling to concede to his demands and it accepted the results of 1920 Cuban general election as valid.

He would later go into exile to the United States. He died in New York City at the age of 63 in 1921. His remains were brought back to Cuba for burial in the Colon Cemetery, Havana.

== Personal life ==
In 1907, José López Rodríguez, Pote, (father of José Antonio López Serrano) financed the electoral campaign that would propel Gómez to the Presidency of the Republic.

A friend of Gómez, Gerardo Machado, became the president of Cuba a few years later.

He was married to América Arias y López, a philanthropist, supporter of Cuban independence, and the second First Lady of Cuba. Their son, Miguel Mariano Gómez, served as the sixth President of Cuba.
