= Francisco Prío =

Cuban attorney and politician (1901–1988)

Francisco Prío Socarrás
- Born: 29 March 1901; Cuba
- Died: 21 February 1988 (aged 86); Miami, Florida USA

Francisco "Paco" Prío Socarrás (29 March 1901 in Cuba – February 21, 1988 in Miami, Florida USA) was a Cuban attorney and politician.

Dr. Prío Socarrás was senator representing Cuba's Pinar del Río Province from 1944–1952. His brother was Cuban President Carlos Prío Socarrás. In 1952, when his brother was overthrown by Fulgencio Batista he and his family went into exile in Miami. He later returned to Cuba when Fidel Castro overthrew Batista in 1959. In late 1960, he grew discontented with the Castro government and returned to Miami.

== Mafia and criminal ties ==
Prío was involved in narcotics trafficking during his time in Cuba, utilizing his political connections to this end. He formed a partnership with Floridian mafia boss Santo Trafficante Sr. in this endeavor. In July 1952 the FBI reported that Jose Aleman, former government minister, had told a US government informant that Prío and his brothers were "narcotics addicts".

Prío had ties with American gangsters operating within Cuba, namely Meyer Lansky and Lucky Luciano. Lansky introduced him to Luciano as "one of our best friends". The Cuban government later deported Luciano under the pressure of economic sanctions from the American government. Anti-corruption senator Eduardo Chibas suggested that the government was reluctant to deport Luciano over fears that he would name his "Cuban associates", among them Prío Socarras. The Cuban Senate recommended that the two "settle their grievances in a duel" "in the interests of this body". They fought each other with swords outside the building, with both obtaining superficial wounds. An August 1964 FBI report describes an exchange of cash between Santo Trafficante Jr. and Prio in the First National Bank of Miami. Trafficante gave Prio $51,000 in cash.

== Personal life ==
He was married to Julia Alvarez Hernandez and he had one son, Fernando Prio. He died of cancer at Mercy Hospital in Miami and is buried in Woodlawn Park Cemetery and Mausoleum (now Caballero Rivero Woodlawn North Park Cemetery and Mausoleum) in Miami, Florida.
