= José Agripino Barnet =

Cuban politician and diplomat

José Agripino Barnet y Vinageras
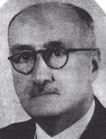

President of Cuba Interim
- In office December 11, 1935 – May 20, 1936
- Vice President: Vacant
- Preceded by: Carlos Mendieta (Interim)
- Succeeded by: Miguel Mariano Gómez

Personal details
- Born: June 23, 1864 Barcelona, Spain
- Died: September 18, 1945 (aged 81) Havana, Cuba
- Party: Liberal Party of Cuba
- Spouse: Marcela Cleard
- Children: Geogina Barnet y Cleard
- Occupation: President

José Agripino Barnet y Vinageras (June 23, 1864 – September 18, 1945) was a Cuban politician and diplomat who served as interim President of Cuba from December 11, 1935 to May 20, 1936.

He was the seventh provisional chief since the fall of Gerardo Machado.

Barnet y Vinageras was born in Spain but his parents were born in Cuba. He graduated from the University of Havana School of Law. In 1887, he went to Paris, where he remained until the installation of the Republic of Cuba in 1902. He was named the Cuban Consul in Paris, France and in 1908 was transferred as the Cuban Consul in Liverpool, England. He was also the Cuban Consul in Rotterdam and Hamburg. He also served in Japan, Brazil, Germany and Switzerland.

He was married to Marcela Cleard and they had one daughter, Georgina Marcelle Barnet y Cleard (who married Henri Jan van de Griendt).
