= Carlos Mendieta =

Interim President of Cuba from 1934 to 1935

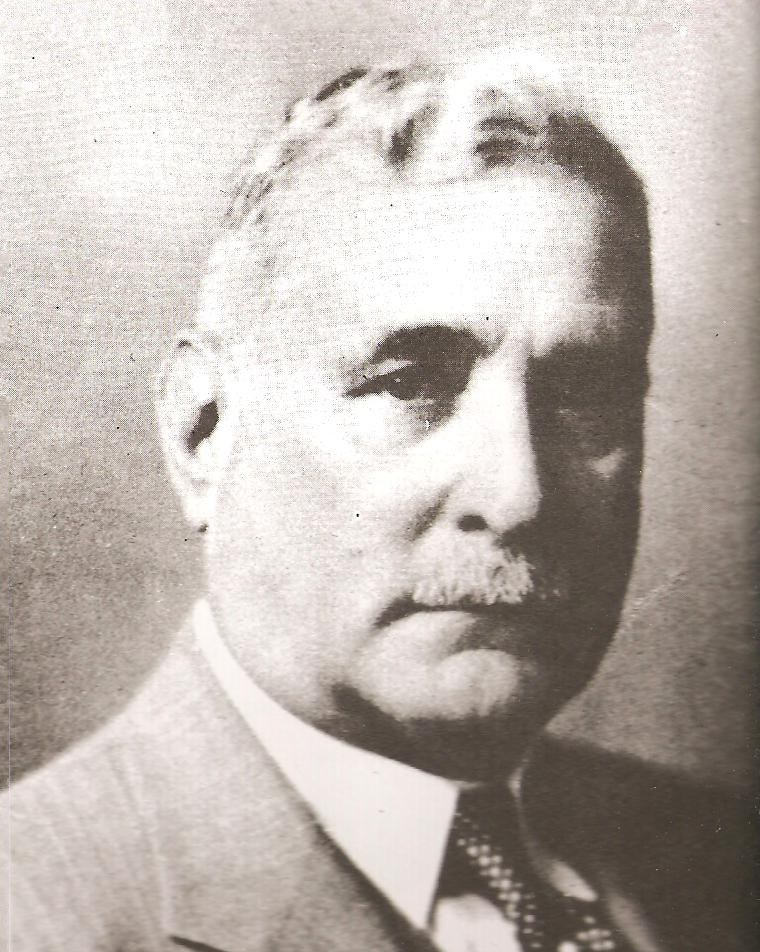

President of Cuba Interim
- In office 18 January 1934 – 11 December 1935
- Vice President: None
- Preceded by: Manuel Márquez Sterling (Interim)
- Succeeded by: José Barnet (Interim)

Personal details
- Born: Carlos Mendieta y Montefur; 4 November 1873 San Antonio de las Vueltas, Las Villas, Spanish Cuba
- Died: 27 September 1960 (aged 86) Havana, Cuba
- Party: Liberal Party of Cuba
- Spouse: Carmela Ledon
- Children: Carmen Mendieta-Ledon

Carlos Mendieta y Montefur (4 November 1873 – 27 September 1960) was a Cuban politician and interim President of Cuba.

A chief opponent of Gerardo Machado, Mendieta was installed as interim President of Cuba in 1934 by a coup led by Fulgencio Batista. During his presidency, women gained the right to vote and the Platt Amendment was rescinded. Mendieta resigned in 1935 after unrest continued.

== Personal life ==
He was married to Carmela Ledon (? - 20 July 1942) and they had one child, Carmen Mendieta-Ledon, who married Calixto Garcia Velez.

== References and further reading ==
- Otero, Juan Joaquin (1954). Libro De Cuba, Una Enciclopedia Ilustrada Que Abarca Las Artes, Las Letras, Las Ciencias, La Economia, La Politica, La Historia, La Docencia, Y ElProgreso General De La Nacion Cubana - Edicion Conmemorative del Cincuentenario de la Republica de Cuba, 1902-1952. (Spanish)

Political offices
Preceded by Manuel Márquez Sterling	President of Cuba; Interim; 18 January 1934 – 11 December 1935	Succeeded by José Barnet
