= 1905 Cuban general election =

- 1 December 1905
- Presidential election
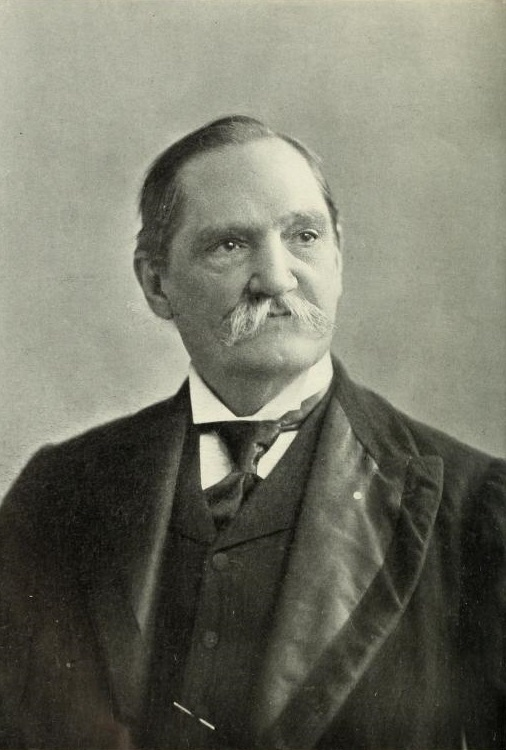
Nominee	Tomás Estrada Palma
Party	Moderate Party
Popular vote	306,874
President before election
Tomás Estrada Palma
Independent
Elected President
Tomás Estrada Palma
Moderate Party

General elections were held in Cuba on 1 December 1905. Tomás Estrada Palma won the presidential election, whilst his Moderate Party won all twelve seats in the Senate and 31 of the 32 seats in the House of Representatives, winning 27 of the 63 seats. Voter turnout was 74%.

== Results ==
=== President ===
Candidate	Party	Votes	%
Tomás Estrada Palma	Moderate Party	306,874	
Total			
Total votes		317,972	–
Registered voters/turnout		429,730	73.99
Source: Nohlen

=== Senate ===
Party	Seats
Moderate Party	12
Total	12
Source: Nohlen

=== House of Representatives ===
Party	Seats
Moderate Party	31
Independents	1
Total	32
Source: Nohlen

== Aftermath ==
The election results were highly contested and accusations of fraud were made. Registration of voters by local electoral boards resulted in an electoral roll of 423,313, a figure American Secretary of War William Howard Taft and Assistant Secretary of State Robert Bacon declared to be 150,000 names too high. According to American professor Russell H. Fitzgibbon, La Discussion, a leading moderate newspaper, protested about electoral fraud. According to a Taft Bacon report of 1906, Freyre de Andrade, a Cuban minister, told American commissioners that it was "impossible to hold an election in Cuba without fraud" and that thousands of extra names had perhaps been added "out of spirit of mischief."

In 1906 American President Theodore Roosevelt created a Peace Commission following the Cuban rebellions of the summer of 1906. The commission was sent to Cuba to investigate the situation and "attempt to restore peace and re-establish law and Order." The Peace Commission found that the congressional elections of 1905 had been "so tainted by fraud as to render them illegal". Taft as self-declared provisional governor of Cuba subsequently suspended the Congress.
