= Miguel Mariano Gómez =

Cuban politician

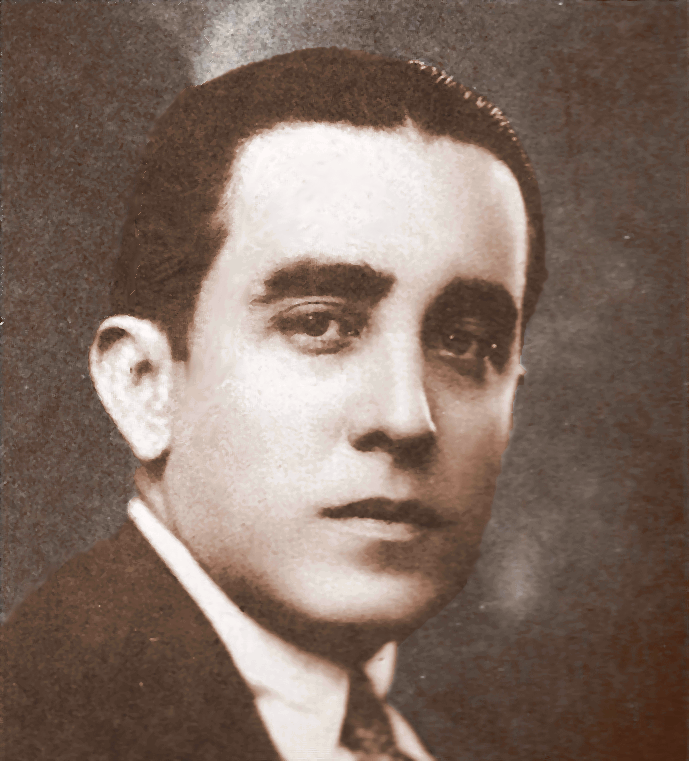

7th President of Cuba
- In office May 20, 1936 – December 24, 1936
- Vice President: Federico Laredo Brú
- Preceded by: José A. Barnet (Interim)
- Succeeded by: Federico Laredo Brú

Personal details
- Born: October 6, 1889 Sancti Spíritus, Spanish Cuba
- Died: October 26, 1950 (aged 61) Havana, Republic of Cuba
- Party: Liberal Party
- Spouse: Serafina Diago
- Children: 3
- Parents: José Miguel Gómez (father); América Arias (mother)

Miguel Mariano Gómez y Arias (Latin American Spanish: [miˈɣel maˈɾjano ˈɣomes i ˈaɾjas]; October 6, 1889 – October 26, 1950) was a Cuban politician who served as the seventh President of Cuba for just over seven months in 1936. Compared to other administrations, there was general peace and tranquillity in Cuba during Gómez's brief presidency. It is claimed that he was a talented orator and writer, and the opposite of the typical "man on a horseback" attributed to previous Cuban Presidents with military backgrounds.

== Early life ==
Gómez was born in Sancti Spíritus, the son of Cuba's second president, José Miguel Gómez and philanthropist América Arias. He attended various schools in Cuba (including a Jesuit school in Cienfuegos) and the United States and graduated as a lawyer from University in Cuba. During his youth he attended the coronation of King George V of the United Kingdom in 1911 as a Special Attaché to the Cuban Legation in London. He married Serafina Diago y Cardenas and they had three daughters, Serafina, Graziella and Margarita Gómez y Diago.

== Political career ==
Gómez served several terms in the House of Representatives and in 1926 was elected mayor of Havana. In 1928, constitutional reforms abolished mayoralty of Havana and Gómez went into exile in New York City. He participated in the failed Río Verde armed expedition against the Gerardo Machado government, was imprisoned, and returned to exile. During his exile, early in the 1930s, he participated in a junta of various leaders of different anti-Machado groups which would often meet at the Biltmore Hotel.

After the ousting of Machado on August 12, 1933, Gómez returned to Havana, founded the Republican Action Party, and in 1934 was again elected mayor of Havana. However, he resigned as mayor due to a widespread doctor's strike. From 1933 to 1936 he led an opposition group known as the Marianistas. During this period of time his home was bombed twice, although he was not injured.

=== Presidency ===
Following years of political instability, Gómez was elected President of Cuba in the 1936 general elections, and was inaugurated on May 20, 1936. However, he served only until December 24, 1936, when he was impeached by Congress following his vetoing of the Nine Cent Law, a revenue on each bag of sugar produced in the country, that was planned to finance the Civic-Rural schools promoted by Fulgencio Batista.

Speaking in December, 1936, towards the end of Gómez's presidency, former president of Cuba, Carlos Hevia, claimed that Batista was trying to force a confrontation with Gómez, stating "A military oligarchy has ruled Cuba for two years. President Gómez has had no real power, but Col Batista now seems to want to attain openly the power he has had all the time behind the scenes. He wants to destroy Gómez by showing him up so that he will have to resign if he is not turned out."

==== Impeachment ====
Gómez was initially impeached by the House of Representatives. The counsel for the House of Representatives, which brought the charges against Gómez, included Antonio Martinez Fraga, a Democrat; a Nationalist named Felipe, and Carlos Palma, a Republican. Senator Rivero interrupted the trial when he announced his resignation as secretary of the impeachment tribunal and claimed "the tribunal is prejudiced, the President lacks guarantees for a fair trial."

The Senate trial charged Gómez with "threatening reprisals against members of the Congress of Cuba who opposed his legislative measures." Chief Justice of the Supreme Court Juan Federico Edelman presided over the trial. It was reported that the trial commenced with quick readings of the charges against Gómez followed by a brief defence document in which Gómez denied coercing members of Congress. Gómez claimed that the trial was "a mere political act to depose the President because of orders and pressure from a source known to all", also stating "I hereby protest against this trial as unconstitutional in the sense that I have no guarantee."

The counsel representing Gómez was Jose M. Gutierrez. Gutierrez gave a lengthy defense which was applauded from the galleries, which were filled with spectators. It was reported that Gutierrez accused the army of interfering in civilian politics and promoting the impeachment. Defending Gómez, Gutierrez claimed "Both the Senate and the public know the accusations against the President exist only in the imagination of the Representatives. Public opinion is with the President, who was duly elected by the people." Before the trial opened Gómez told the press "I think the decision is already signed. When one performs one's duty it sometimes makes a painful picture, but it leaves the conscience tranquil."

The trial concluded early on December 24, 1936 when the Senate voted to impeach Gómez by a vote of 22–12. The Senate statement read: "Dr. Miguel Mariano Gómez y Arias, President of the Republic is hereby declared guilty of transgression against the free functioning of the legislative power and is removed from the Presidency of the Republic, quitting that office upon notification."

Following the conclusion of the trial, a Senate committee travelled to the home of Vice President Federico Laredo Bru to notify him that he had become President. Later on in the day crowds gathered at the Presidential Palace cheering for Gómez as he departed to his residence in the Prado area of Havana. Later in the day, from his house, Gómez issued a statement claiming his impeachment was "highly unjust" and a victory for the military, also saying "It has all been useless. Something more is desired: to give orders from Camp Columbia [Army Headquarters] to the [Presidential] Palace." It was reported that Gómez indicated that it would have been more transparent if Batista would have openly entered the Presidential Palace.

=== Post-presidency ===
Gómez left Cuba for the United States, but later returned to Cuba in 1939. In 1940, he ran for the mayoralty of Havana again, but lost to Raul Menocal. He then retired from public life and died in Havana in 1950 at the age of 61 following a long illness.

In 1951, Representative Manuel Dorta-Duque proposed the Moral Rehabilitation Law of Miguel Mariano Gómez Arias, thus annulling the sentence that dismissed him as President of the Republic. Although Gómez Arias died months before the approval of this law, his dignity was restored to the Cuban people.

Political offices
Preceded by José Barnet	President of Cuba; 20 May 1936 – 24 December 1936	Succeeded by Federico Laredo Brú
