= Tomás Estrada Palma =

1st President of Cuba (1902–06)

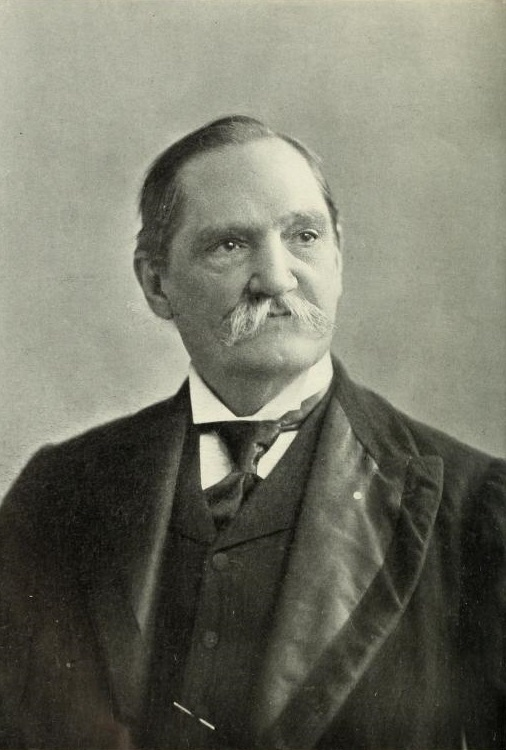
- Estrada Palma in 1899

1st President of Cuba
- In office 20 May 1902 – 28 September 1906
- Vice President: Luis Estévez y Romero and Domingo Méndez Capote
- Preceded by: Office established
- Succeeded by: José Miguel Gómez

4th President of the Republic of Cuba in Arms
- In office March 1876 – October 1877 (Captured and imprisoned by Spanish forces)
- Preceded by: Juan Bautista Spotorno
- Succeeded by: Francisco Javier de Céspedes

Personal details
- Born: Tomás Estrada Palma c. July 9, 1835 Bayamo, Spanish Cuba
- Died: November 4, 1908 (aged 73) Santiago de Cuba, Cuba
- Party: Cuban Revolutionary Party (1892–1898); Moderate Party (1905-?)
- Spouse: Genoveva Guardiola Arbizú
- Children: Jose M. Estrada-Palma Guardiola
- Occupation: Politician, educator

Tomás Estrada Palma (Spanish: [toˈmas esˈtɾaða ˈpalma]; c. July 9, 1835 – November 4, 1908) was a Cuban politician, the president of the Republic of Cuba in Arms during the Ten Years' War, and the first President of Cuba, between May 20, 1902, and September 28, 1906. His collateral career as a New York City area educator and writer enabled Estrada Palma to create pro-Cuban literature aimed at gaining sympathy, assistance and publicity. He was eventually successful in garnering the attention of influential Americans. He was an early and persistent voice calling for the United States to intervene in Cuba on humanitarian grounds. During his presidency his major accomplishments included improving Cuba's infrastructure, communication, and public health.

== Personal and early life ==
He was born in Bayamo, Spanish Cuba, July 9, 1835, to Dr. Andrés María Estrada y Oduardo and María Candelaria Palma Tamayo. His exact birth date is not known because of a fire in Bayamo Town Hall on January 19, 1869, that destroyed his birth records. An article in Bohemia magazine issued October 4, 1944 indicates that his baptism document, contained in his University of Havana file, shows a birth date of July 6, 1832. His paternal grandfather was Dr. Manuel José de Estrada, well-known professional in the region of Cauto, Cuba (current-day Bayamo). He was given his name "Tomás" in honor of his maternal grandfather, Don Tomás de Palma, a rich landowner. What is known about his early life is his schooling in the private school of Toribio Hernández, Havana, and his attendance in the University of Havana in which he received a philosophy degree on July 19, 1854. He was taken out of the roster in the University of Seville on January 29, 1857, for excessive absences. He withdrew on June 29, 1857, of the same year for personal reasons. On May 15, 1881, he married Genoveva Guardiola Arbizú (1854–1926), daughter of General José Santos Guardiola, President of Honduras, Estrada Palma and his wife had six children. He was regarded as a courteous man of few words. It is also said that Estrada Palma had great tenacity.

== Early career ==
From 1857 to 1868, he returned to Bayamo and became an administrator and a local teacher. He continued to teach in Honduras and Orange County, New York.

== War for independence ==
Estrada Palma became the President of the Cuban Republic in Arms during the Ten Years' War.

Estrada Palma was captured by Spanish troops and sent into exile. While in exile, he traveled to New York City, where he worked with José Martí to gather political support for a political revolution in Cuba.

After Martí's death, Estrada Palma became the new leader of the Cuban Junta. His role in the party was to be its chief representative. With that authorization, he was able to have diplomatic relations with other countries, including the US.

After the Government in Arms was established, it sent Estrada Palma to Washington, DC, as its diplomat. He was largely successful. Estrada Palma received assistance from various individuals including an American banker who attempted to offer Spain $150 million to give up the island.

Estrada Palma was also assisted by William Randolph Hearst's newspapers to spread the cause of the Cuban Revolutionary Party by posting articles sympathetic to the Cuban revolutionaries. The newspapers assisted the revolutionaries in gaining materials, support, and popularity for the movement.

In a move that showed some real statesmanship and an ability to use media, Estrada Palma got the US Congress to pass a joint resolution on April 19, 1898. The resolution disavowed the Spanish colonization of Cuba and supported the independence of the Republic of Cuba. It also highlighted that the United States had no intention of occupying or annexing the island. (see Spanish–American War).

After the Spanish–American War, Estrada Palma dissolved one of the leading factions of the Cuban revolutionary armies: the Liberation Army, mostly black and rural. He gave more political power to the Assembly of Representatives, the allegedly more pragmatic white urban dwellers, neo-annexationists, and elitists.

He had effectively given power a chosen few of the former revolutionaries to achieve political dominance within Cuban politics. At the same time, he would attract US assistance in Cuba to rebuild the country.

== First term ==
After a few years of General Leonard Wood's rule in Cuba, elections were to be held on December 31, 1901. There were two political parties, the Republicans, who were conservative and wanted national autonomy, headed by José Miguel Gómez, and the National Liberals, who were a popular party that wanted Cuba to go toward local autonomy, headed by Alfredo Zayas. Both supported Estrada Palma. However, he did not campaign but instead remained in the United States, where he was a citizen.

Estrada Palma's opponent, General Bartolomé Masó, withdrew his candidacy in protest against favoritism by the occupational government and the manipulation of the political machine by Estrada Palma's followers. Thus, Estrada Palma was left as the only candidate. On December 31, 1901, Estrada Palma was elected president.

To his credit, Estrada Palma did not want to have a presidency based on racial barriers. Like many other Cuban revolutionaries, he had seen the new nation as a nonracial republic in which Afro-Cubans would be equal to whites in society. Before his presidency, Estrada Palma assured that he would bring 100 public service jobs to Afro-Cubans and repeal American regulations that supported segregation in Cuba.

The Platt Amendment was signed on March 2, 1901. The amendment allowed the United States to interfere in the domestic policies of Cuba and to lease land for naval bases or coal stations.

American troops left after the Cuban government signed a bill lowering tariffs on American products and incorporated the Platt Amendment into its constitution. Many American companies came to do business in Cuba.

On February 16, 1903, Estrada Palma signed the Cuban-American Treaty of Relations, agreeing to lease the Guantanamo Bay area to the United States in perpetuity for use as a naval base and coaling station. That was a minor victory for the Estrada Palma administration for Washington had wanted five naval bases on the island. It is a testament to his diplomatic skills that Estrada Palma was able to obtain the reduction, even with American troops stationed in the island. His policies were also responsible for improvements in education, communications, and public health, which had suffered from the devastation created by the war. As an example, land prices between 1902 and 1905 went up and he built over 328 km of roads in Cuba. In 1905 Palma formed the “Gabinete de Combate” or the “Fighting Cabinet” as the cabinet ministers consisted of all veterans who fought during the Cuban Wars of Independence. The principal figure in the new cabinet was General Fernando Freyde de Andrade, Secretary of the Government.

Estrada Palma paid much attention to public works especially as they related to improving the sanitary conditions of the country as well as expanding the means of communication throughout the island. Admittedly funds originally destined for educational buildings were at first reduced and later cut. Under his administration the number of immigrants increased from 10,000 in 1902 to 40,000 in 1905. Estrada Palma was regarded a fiscal conservative, preferring to keep any budget deficits at a minimum if possible. He is also credited for being one of the few Cuban Presidents for not significantly misusing public funds. By the time Estrada Palma left office it is said that the Cuban Treasury had a few million dollars at its disposable. Estrada Palma summarized his budget plans through in one his statements “it is most imperative that the State has at its disposal secure and sufficient sources of revenue in order to cover, within a framework of prudent economic policies, the inevitable expenses of multiple departments within the public administration.”

== Second term ==
Estrada Palma was re-elected unopposed in the 1905 Cuban general election, with his second term officially commencing May 20, 1906. This time, there was violent opposition by the liberals. Each side claimed electoral fraud had affected the outcome. One story being that The National Labor Party used el copo, fraud to prevent minority victory in the first election.

The main issue in the second election was the equal representation of the Cuban provinces. Critics of Estrada Palma such as General Faustino Guerra Puente accused him of ignoring the constitution. Still, other politicians and generals, possibly even including Guerra Puente himself, recognized Estrada Palma as the only person able to lead Cuba.

The response to the opponents Alfredo Zayas was to have the force of the police and the rural guard to allow Estrada Palma to claim victory. Estrada Palma and the moderate camp appealed to the US for intervention, and in 1906, the US began the Second Occupation of Cuba and installed a provisional occupation government, which lasted from 1906 to 1909. Another pro-American government was established in Cuba under Charles Magoon. Finally, on September 28, 1906, Estrada Palma, by then 71 years old, resigned along with the rest of the executive branch, leaving Cuba without a successor president. This choice of action allowed the United States to take control under the Platt Amendment.

President Palma's resignation read as follows:

To the Congress of Cuba

[1] The course of events that has taken hold as a result of the public disorder caused by the armed revolt in the Province of Pinar del Rio; [2] the fact that a U.S. Commission of Peace, in representation of Washington, is currently in place in the Cuban capital, which has in turn caused the loss of authority of the Executive (Cuban President), while the rebels continue to roam free at arms and with a menacing attitude. [3] Wishing, on the other hand, honestly and wholeheartedly that the country return to a normal state of order and general tranquility and [4] unable to accept the conditions proposed by the aforementioned Commission, I have resolved as a patriotic act to present unto the Cuban Congress, with irrevocable character, my resignation to the post of President of the Republic. Ensuring that it will be accepted, I give thanks to the members of both chambers and I offer you the assurances of my highest consideration. Signed at the Palace of the Presidency, September 28, 1906.

== Death ==
Estrada Palma died in Santiago de Cuba at 11:45 p.m. on November 4, 1908, from pneumonia. He was temporarily residing in Calle Sagarra No. 17

== Legacy ==
Estrada Palma is known less for his accomplishments in education, revolution, and infrastructure than for being a part of the annexation agenda of and his subservience to the United States.

== Honors ==
In 1903, a statue of Estrada Palma was erected in the Avenida de los Presidentes, in Havana. His statue was pulled down by Fidel Castro's revolutionaries, reportedly because they blamed Estrada Palma for starting the trend of US interventions in Cuba. The plinth, with a pair of shoes, remains.

Estrada Palma spent many years of his US exile in the town of Woodbury in Orange County, New York. Along a road that now bears his name (Estrada Road, in the hamlet of Central Valley), he ran a summer camp, which has since been abandoned. During his presidency, Estrada Palma kept an "T. Estrada Palma Fund" to buy prizes for academic achievements in Orange County.

== Sources ==
- Garcia, Margarita. (2016). Before "Cuba Libre" The Making of Cuba's First President Tomas Estrada Palma. Denver, Colorado: Outskirt Press. pp. Kindle Location 1950. ISBN 978-1-4787-7391-7.
- Auxier, George W. (1939). "The Propaganda Activities of the Cuban Junta in Precipitating the Spanish American War, 1895–1898," The Hispanic American Historical Review. Vol. 19: pp. 286–305.
- Sweig, Julia E. (2009). Cuba: What Everyone Needs to Know. New York: Oxford University Press. P. 9. ISBN 978-0-19-989670-7.
- Kapcia, Antoni. (2000). Cuba: Island of Dreams. New York: Oxford University Press. P. 62. ISBN 978-1-85973-331-8.
- Nohlen, Dieter (2005). Elections in the Americas: A data handbook. New York, NY: Oxford University Press. p. 2005. ISBN 978-0-19-928357-6.
- Fuente, Alejandro de la. (1991). "Myths of Racial Democracy: Cuba, 1900–1912." Latin American Research Review. Vol. 34, No. 3: 39–73.
- Pappademos, Melina (2011). Black Political Activism and the Cuban Republic. Chapel Hill. NC: University of North Carolina Press. P. 63. ISBN 978-0-8078-3490-9.
- Thomas, Hugh. (1971). Cuba: The Pursuit of Freedom. New York: Harper & Hugh. p. 472. ISBN 978-0-06-014259-9.
- Puente, Faustino Guerra. (September 1906). "Causes of the Cuban Insurrection." The North American Review. Vol. 183, No. 599: 538–540.
- Utset, Marial Iglesias. (2011). A Cultural History of Cuba during the US Occupation, 1898–1902. Chapel Hill, NC: The University of North Carolina Press. p. 42. ISBN 978-0-8078-7192-8.
- Fitzgibbon, Russell H. (1964). Cuba and the United States, 1900–1935. Brasted, Kent: United Kingdom: Russell & Russell. p. 121. ASIN B00656T7SO
- Otero, Juan Joaquin (1954). Libro De Cuba, Una Enciclopedia Ilustrada Que Abarca Las Artes, Las Letras, Las Ciencias, La Economia, La Politica, La Historia, La Docencia, Y ElProgreso General De La Nacion Cubana – Edicion Conmemorative del Cincuentenario de la Republica de Cuba, 1902–1952. (Spanish)
