= President of Cuba =

Head of state

President of the Republic of Cuba
- Presidente de la República de Cuba
- Coat of arms of Cuba

- Presidential standard

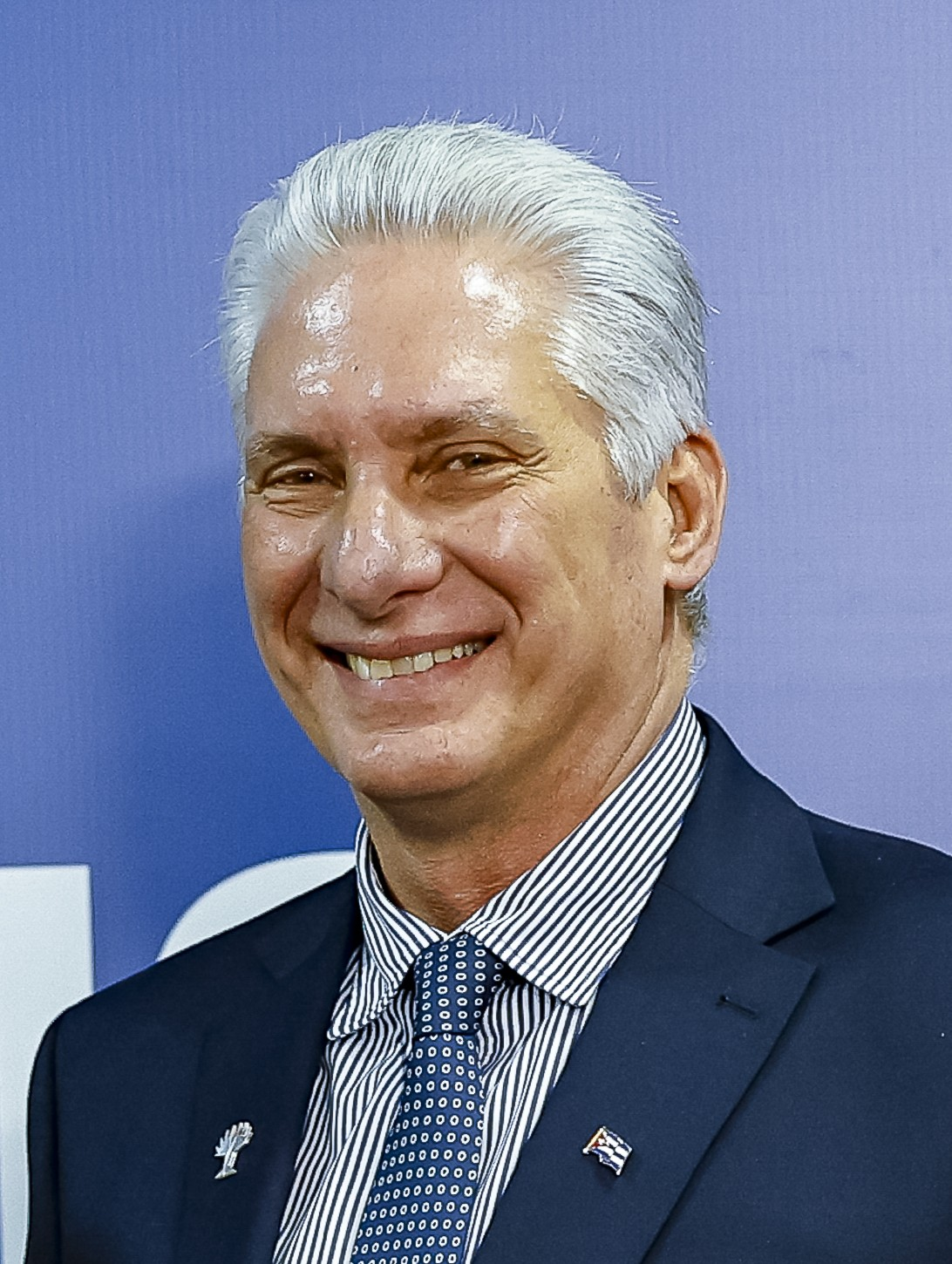
- Incumbent; Miguel Díaz-Canel since 10 October 2019
- Executive branch of the Government of Cuba
- Style: Mr./Madam President (Señor/a Presidente/a) (informal); The Most Excellent (Excelentísimo/a Señor/a) (diplomatic)
- Type: Head of state
- Status: Second highest ranking official (Note: Rank after the First Secretary of the Communist Party.)
- Member of: National Assembly of People's Power
- Reports to: Council of State
- Residence: Palacio de la Revolución
- Nominator: National Assembly of People's Power
- Appointer: National Assembly of People's Power
- Term length: Five years, renewable once
- Constituting instrument: Constitution of Cuba (2019)
- Precursor: President of the Council of State
- Formation: April 12, 1902 (124 years ago)
- First holder: Tomás Estrada Palma
- Abolished: December 1976–October 2019
- Deputy: Vice President
- Website: www.presidencia.gob.cu (in Spanish and English)

The president of Cuba (Spanish: presidente de Cuba), officially the president of the Republic of Cuba (Spanish: presidente de la República de Cuba), is the head of state of Cuba. The office in its current form was established under the Constitution of 2019. The president is the second-highest office in Cuba, under the first secretary of the Communist Party of Cuba. Miguel Díaz-Canel became President of the Council of State on 19 April 2018, taking over from Raúl Castro, and has been President of Cuba since 10 October 2019.

The first secretary of the Communist Party of Cuba continues to be the highest-ranking political position in Cuba. Fidel Castro held the position from 1965 to 2011, and Raúl Castro from 2011 until the 8th Congress of the Communist Party of Cuba, held 16–19 April 2021, when he retired from office.

== History ==
Under the 1901 constitution, Cuba had a presidential system based on that of the United States. In 1940, a new constitution reformed the government into a semi-presidential system. On 2 December 1976, the executive was reformed again by a new national constitution, this time in emulation of the Soviet Union. The presidential office was abolished and replaced by a collective head of state, the Council of State, elected by the National Assembly of People's Power. However, unlike the USSR's arrangements, where the chairmen of the Presidium of the Supreme Soviet and the Council of Ministers were distinct posts, the chairman of the Council of State also chaired the Council of Ministers. Furthermore, unlike English and Russian, Spanish does not distinguish between the terms "chairman" (Russian: председатель) and "president" (Russian: президент), translating both as "Presidente". Thus, when back-translated into English, the term used was not "Chairman" (on the precedent of similar institutions in countries whose languages have a chairman/president distinction, such as the USSR and East Germany), but rather "President", from the shared etymology with the Spanish "Presidente".

On 24 February 2019, another constitution – Cuba's current – was adopted in a referendum. Under it, the government was again re-organized, and the posts of President and Prime Minister were restored. This reorganization took effect on 11 October 2019. Díaz-Canel was President of the Council of State until 10 October 2019 and President of the Republic after that date. Under the new constitution, the position of President of the Council of State continues as a separate role, subordinate to President of the Republic. The new document also limited the President to two consecutive five-year terms.

In cases of the absence, illness or death of the President of Cuba, the Vice President assumes the presidential duties.

== Powers ==
The President of Cuba is mandated to have the following powers as per the Constitution:

1. Propose to the National Assembly of People's Power, once elected by that body, the Prime Minister of Cuba and the members of the Council of Ministers;
2. Accept (based on personal preference) the resignation of the Prime Minister and members of the Council of Ministers or propose either to the National Assembly of People's Power or the Council of State the replacement of any of those members and, in both cases, to propose the corresponding substitutes;
3. Receive the credentials of the heads of delegation of foreign diplomatic missions. This responsibility may be delegated to any of the Vice Presidents of the Council of State;
4. Assume the supreme command of all armed forces and determine their general organization;
5. Preside over the National Defense Council;
6. Declare a state emergency in those cases provided for in this Constitution, stating his decision, as soon as the circumstances permit it, to the National Assembly of People's Power or to the Council of State if the Assembly is unable to meet, according to legal effects;
7. Sign decree-laws and other resolutions of the Council of State and the legal provisions adopted by the Council of Ministers or its executive committee, and arrange for their publication in the Official Gazette of the Republic;
8. Assume all other duties assigned by the Constitution or by the laws of the Republic to him or her.

== See also ==
- Elections in Cuba
- First Secretary of the Communist Party of Cuba
- Prime Minister of Cuba
  - List of prime ministers of Cuba
- Cuba under Fidel Castro
- 2006–08 Cuban transfer of presidential duties
- List of colonial governors of Cuba
- List of heads of state of Cuba
