= List of heads of state of Cuba =

This article lists the heads of state of Cuba from 1902 until the present day.

== Constitutional background ==
Between 1902 and 1976 (under the 1901 and the 1940 constitutions), the role of the head of state was performed by the president of Cuba.

Between 1976 and 2019 (under the 1976 Constitution), the position of president was abolished and replaced by the president of the Council of State.

On 24 February 2019 (under the 2019 Constitution), the position of president was restored, effective 10 October 2019.

The current president is Miguel Díaz-Canel, since 19 April 2018.

== List of officeholders ==
=== Republic of Cuba (1902–1906) ===
No.	Portrait	Name (Birth–Death)	Term of office			Political party	Elected	Ref.
No.	Portrait	Name (Birth–Death)	Took office	Left office	Time in office	Political party	Elected	Ref.
President of the Republic
1		Tomás Estrada Palma (1835–1908)	20 May 1902	28 September 1906	4 years, 131 days	Republican Party	1901	
1		Tomás Estrada Palma (1835–1908)	20 May 1902	28 September 1906	4 years, 131 days	Republican Party	1905	

=== Second Occupation of Cuba (1906–1909) ===
No.	Portrait	Name (Birth–Death)	Term of office			Appointed by	Ref.
No.	Portrait	Name (Birth–Death)	Took office	Left office	Time in office	Appointed by	Ref.
Provisional Governors
–		William Howard Taft (1857–1930)	29 September 1906	13 October 1906	14 days	President; Theodore Roosevelt	
–		Charles Edward Magoon (1861–1920)	13 October 1906	28 January 1909	2 years, 107 days	President; Theodore Roosevelt	

=== Republic of Cuba (1909–1959) ===
No.	Portrait	Name (Birth–Death)	Term of office			Political party	Elected	Prime minister(s)	Ref.
No.	Portrait	Name (Birth–Death)	Took office	Left office	Time in office	Political party	Elected	Prime minister(s)	Ref.
Presidents of the Republic
2		José Miguel Gómez (1858–1921)	28 January 1909	20 May 1913	4 years, 112 days	Liberal Party	1908	Not established	
3		Mario García Menocal (1866–1941)	20 May 1913	20 May 1921	8 years	National Conservative Party	1912	Not established	
3		Mario García Menocal (1866–1941)	20 May 1913	20 May 1921	8 years	National Conservative Party	1916	Not established	
4		Alfredo Zayas y Alfonso (1861–1934)	20 May 1921	20 May 1925	4 years	Liberal Party	1920	Not established	
5		Gerardo Machado (1871–1939)	20 May 1925	12 August 1933	8 years, 84 days	Liberal Party	1924	Not established	
5		Gerardo Machado (1871–1939)	20 May 1925	12 August 1933	8 years, 84 days	Liberal Party	1928	Not established	
–		Alberto Herrera Franchi (1874–1954); Acting	12 August 1933	13 August 1933	1 day	Liberal Party	–	Not established	
–		Carlos Manuel de Céspedes y Quesada (1871–1939); Acting	13 August 1933	5 September 1933	23 days	Liberal Party	–	Not established	
–		Pentarchy of 1933; Acting	5 September 1933	10 September 1933	5 days	Non partisan	–	Not established	
6		Ramón Grau (1881–1969)	10 September 1933	15 January 1934	127 days	Authentic Party	–	Not established	
–		Carlos Hevia (1900–1964); Acting	15 January 1934	18 January 1934	3 days	Authentic Party	–	Not established	
–		Manuel Márquez Sterling (1872–1934); Acting	18 January 1934	18 January 1934	0 days	Liberal Party	–	Not established	
–		Carlos Mendieta (1873–1960); Acting	18 January 1934	11 December 1935	1 year, 327 days	National Union	–	Not established	
–		José Agripino Barnet (1864–1945); Acting	11 December 1935	20 May 1936	161 days	National Union	–	Not established	
7		Miguel Mariano Gómez (1889–1950)	20 May 1936	24 December 1936	218 days	National Union	1936	Not established	
8		Federico Laredo Brú (1875–1946)	24 December 1936	10 October 1940	3 years, 291 days	National Union	–	Not established	
9		Fulgencio Batista (1901–1973)	10 October 1940	10 October 1944	4 years	Democratic Socialist Coalition	1940	Carlos Saladrigas Zayas (1940–1942)	
9		Fulgencio Batista (1901–1973)	10 October 1940	10 October 1944	4 years	Democratic Socialist Coalition	1940	Ramón Zaydín (1942–1944)	
9		Fulgencio Batista (1901–1973)	10 October 1940	10 October 1944	4 years	Democratic Socialist Coalition	1940	Anselmo Alliegro y Milá (1944)	
(6)		Ramón Grau (1881–1969)	10 October 1944	10 October 1948	4 years	Authentic Party	1944	Félix Lancís Sánchez (1944–1945)	
(6)		Ramón Grau (1881–1969)	10 October 1944	10 October 1948	4 years	Authentic Party	1944	Carlos Prío Socarrás (1945–1947)	
(6)		Ramón Grau (1881–1969)	10 October 1944	10 October 1948	4 years	Authentic Party	1944	Raúl López del Castillo (1947–1948)	
10		Carlos Prío Socarrás (1903–1977)	10 October 1948	10 March 1952	3 years, 152 days	Authentic Party	1948	Manuel Antonio de Varona (1948–1950)	
10		Carlos Prío Socarrás (1903–1977)	10 October 1948	10 March 1952	3 years, 152 days	Authentic Party	1948	Félix Lancís Sánchez (1950–1951)	
10		Carlos Prío Socarrás (1903–1977)	10 October 1948	10 March 1952	3 years, 152 days	Authentic Party	1948	Óscar Gans (1951–1952)	
–		Fulgencio Batista (1901–1973); Acting	10 March 1952	14 August 1954	2 years, 157 days	Progressive Action Party	–	Himself (1952)	
–		Andrés Domingo del Castillo (1892–1979); Acting	14 August 1954	24 February 1955	194 days	Progressive Action Party	–	–	
(9)		Fulgencio Batista (1901–1973)	24 February 1955	1 January 1959	3 years, 311 days	Progressive Action Party	1954	Jorge García Montes (1955–1957)	
(9)		Fulgencio Batista (1901–1973)	24 February 1955	1 January 1959	3 years, 311 days	Progressive Action Party	1954	Andrés Rivero Agüero (1957–1958)	
(9)		Fulgencio Batista (1901–1973)	24 February 1955	1 January 1959	3 years, 311 days	Progressive Action Party	1954	Emilio Núñez Portuondo (1958)	
(9)		Fulgencio Batista (1901–1973)	24 February 1955	1 January 1959	3 years, 311 days	Progressive Action Party	1954	Gonzalo Güell (1958–1959)	
–		Carlos Manuel Piedra (1895–1988); Acting	1 January 1959	1 January 1959	0 days	Independent	–	–	

=== Republic of Cuba (1959–present) ===
No.	Portrait	Name (Birth–Death)	Term of office			Political party	Prime minister(s)	Ref.
No.	Portrait	Name (Birth–Death)	Took office	Left office	Time in office	Political party	Prime minister(s)	Ref.
Presidents of the Republic
11		Manuel Urrutia Lleó (1901–1981)	2 January 1959	18 July 1959	197 days	Independent	José Miró Cardona (1959)	
11		Manuel Urrutia Lleó (1901–1981)	2 January 1959	18 July 1959	197 days	Independent	Fidel Castro (1959–1976)	
12		Osvaldo Dorticós Torrado (1919–1983)	18 July 1959	2 December 1976	17 years, 137 days	Popular Socialist Party	Fidel Castro (1959–1976)	
12		Osvaldo Dorticós Torrado (1919–1983)	18 July 1959	2 December 1976	17 years, 137 days	Communist Party	Fidel Castro (1959–1976)	
Presidents of the Council of State
13		Fidel Castro (1926–2016)	2 December 1976	24 February 2008	31 years, 84 days	Communist Party	Himself (as President of the Council of Ministers)	
14		Raúl Castro (born 1931)	24 February 2008	19 April 2018	10 years, 54 days	Communist Party	Himself (as President of the Council of Ministers)	
15		Miguel Díaz-Canel (born 1960)	19 April 2018	10 October 2019	1 year, 174 days	Communist Party	Himself (as President of the Council of Ministers)	
President of the Republic
(15)		Miguel Díaz-Canel (born 1960)	10 October 2019	Incumbent	7 years, 30 days	Communist Party	Manuel Marrero Cruz	

== See also ==
- Captaincy General of Cuba
- Military Government of Cuba
- Provisional Government of Cuba
- List of colonial governors of Cuba
- Republic of Cuba (1902–1959)
- Council of State (Cuba)
  - President of Cuba
  - Vice President of Cuba
- Council of Ministers (Cuba)
  - Prime Minister of Cuba
- Guantanamo Bay Naval Base
  - List of commanders of Guantanamo Bay Naval Base
