= Corruption in Cuba =

Corruption in Cuba is a serious concern. Cuba has suffered from widespread corruption since the establishment of the Republic of Cuba in 1902. The book Corruption in Cuba states that public ownership resulted in "a lack of identifiable ownership and widespread misuse and theft of state resources... when given opportunity, few citizens hesitate to steal from the government." Furthermore, the complex relationship between governmental and economic institutions makes them especially "prone to corruption."

The question of what causes corruption in Cuba presently and historically continues to be discussed and debated by scholars. There are the traditional principles of governance that it inherited from Spain, which was known as a notoriously corrupt regime in its interactions with the New World. Jules R. Benjamin suggests that Cuba's corrupt politics were a product of the colonial heritage of Cuban politics and the financial aid provided by the United States that favoured international sugar prices in the late 19th and early 20th centuries. Following the Second World War, the level of corruption in Cuba, among many other Latin American and Caribbean countries, was said to have risen significantly. Some scholars, such as Eduardo Sáenz Rovner, attribute this to North America's increased involvement in Cuba after the First World War, which isolated Cuban workers. Cubans were excluded from a large sector of the economy and were unable to participate in managerial roles that were taken over by United States employers. Along similar lines, Louis A. Pérez has written that “World War Two created new opportunities for Cuban economic development, few of which, however, were fully realized. Funds were used irrationally. Corruption and graft increased and contributed in no small part to missed opportunities, but so did mismanagement and miscalculation.”

Transparency International's 2025 Corruption Perceptions Index gave Cuba a score of 40 on a scale from 0 ("highly corrupt") to 100 ("very clean"). When ranked by score, Cuba ranked 84th among the 182 countries in the Index, where the country ranked first is perceived to have the most honest public sector. For comparison with regional scores, the best score among the countries of the Americas (Note: Argentina, Bahamas, Barbados, Belize, Bolivia, Brazil, Canada, Chile, Colombia, Costa Rica, Cuba, Dominica, Dominican Republic, Ecuador, El Salvador, Grenada, Guatemala, Guyana, Haiti, Honduras, Jamaica, Mexico, Nicaragua, Panama, Paraguay, Peru, Saint Lucia, Saint Vincent and the Grenadines, Suriname, Trinidad and Tobago, United States of America, Uruguay, Venezuela) was 75, the average score was 42 and the worst score was 10. For comparison with worldwide scores, the best score was 89 (ranked 1), the average score was 42, and the worst score was 9 (ranked 181, in a two-way tie).

== History ==
=== Pre-Revolution ===
In the decades following the United States' invasion of Cuba in 1898, and formal independence from the U.S. on 20 May 1902, Cuba experienced a period of significant instability, enduring a number of revolts, coups and a period of U.S. military occupation. The Republic of Cuba largely became characterized by a deeply ingrained tradition of corruption where political participation resulted in opportunities for elites to engage in wealth accumulation. Cuba's first presidential period under Don Tomás Estrada Palma from 1902 to 1906 was considered to uphold the best standards of administrative integrity in the history of the Republic of Cuba. However, a United States intervention in 1906 resulted in Charles Edward Magoon, an American diplomat, taking over the government until 1909. Although Magoon's government did not condone corrupt practices, there is debate as to how much was done to stop what was widespread especially with the surge of American money coming into the small country. Hugh Thomas suggests that while Magoon disapproved of corrupt practices, corruption persisted under his administration and he undermined the autonomy of the judiciary and their court decisions. (Note: "After a general amnesty in favor of those who took part in the August revolution, Magoon certainly behaved very often as if he were the court of appeal, mitigating the severity of the Spanish legislation and the incorruptibility of the judiciary." (English translation)) On 29 January 1909, the sovereign government of Cuba was restored, and José Miguel Gómez became president. No explicit evidence of Magoon's corruption ever surfaced, but his parting gesture of issuing lucrative Cuban contracts to U.S. firms was a continued point of contention. Cuba's subsequent president, José Miguel Gómez, was the first to become involved in pervasive corruption and government corruption scandals. These scandals involved bribes that were allegedly paid to Cuban officials and legislators under a contract to search the Havana harbour, as well as the payment of fees to government associates and high-level officials. Gómez's successor, Mario García Menocal, wanted to put an end to the corruption scandals and claimed to be committed to administrative integrity as he ran on a slogan of "honesty, peace and work". Despite his intentions, corruption actually intensified under his government from 1913 to 1921. (Note: "Before coming to power, Menocal was respected as a capable man, but he was distrusted for being too closely identified with the United States. As president he became known as a man more committed to bribery and corruption than Gómez. It was said that when he took office as president, he had one million dollars, and when he left in 1921 he had forty." (English translation)) Instances of fraud became more common while private actors and contractors frequently colluded with public officials and legislators. Charles Edward Chapman attributes the increase of corruption to the sugar boom that occurred in Cuba under the Menocal administration. Furthermore, the advent of World War One enabled the Cuban government to manipulate sugar prices, the sales of exports and import permits. While in office, García Menocal hosted his college fraternity, in the 1920 Delta Kappa Epsilon National Convention, the first international fraternity conference outside the US, which took place in Cuba. He was responsible for creating the Cuban Peso; until his presidency Cuba used both the Spanish Real and US Dollar. President Menocal left the Cuban national treasury in overdraft and therefore in precarious financial situation.

Alfredo Zayas succeeded Menocal from 1921 to 1925 and engaged in what Calixto Masó refers to as the "maximum expression of administrative corruption". Both petty and grand corruption spread to nearly all aspects of public life and the Cuban administration became largely characterized by nepotism as Zayas relied on friends and relatives to illegally gain greater access to wealth. (Note: "The university was a good example of corruption, and was full of 'professors' who were paid without teaching, and were mere political extras or relatives of the president." (English translation)) Gerardo Machado succeeded Zayas from 1925 to 1933, and entered the presidency with widespread popularity and support from the major political parties. However, his support declined over time. Due to Zayas' previous policies, Gerardo Machado aimed to diminish corruption and improve the public sector's performance through an "honest administration", which had been referred to as moralización, from 1925 to 1933. While he was successfully able to reduce the amounts of low level and petty corruption, grand corruption still largely persisted. Machado embarked on development projects that enabled the persistence of grand corruption through inflated costs and the creation of "large margins" that enabled public officials to appropriate money illegally. Under his government, opportunities for corruption became concentrated into fewer hands with "centralized government purchasing procedures" and the collection of bribes among a smaller number of bureaucrats and administrators. Through the development of real estate infrastructures and the growth of Cuba's tourism industry, Machado's administration was able to use insider information to profit from private sector business deals. Many people objected to his running again for re-election in 1928, as his victory violated his promise to serve for only one term. As protests and rebellions became more strident, his administration curtailed free speech and used repressive police tactics against opponents. Machado unleashed a wave of violence against his critics, and there were numerous murders and assassinations committed by the police and army under Machado's administration. The extent of his involvement in these is disputed, though Russell Porter makes the claim that Machado confessed to being involved. Though the extent of Machado's participation in such violent acts is unknown, he has since been described as a dictator. In May 1933, Machado was forced out as newly appointed US ambassador Sumner Welles arrived in Cuba and initiated negotiation with the opposition groups for a government to succeed Machado's. A provisional government headed by Carlos Manuel de Céspedes y Quesada (son of Cuban independence hero Carlos Manuel de Céspedes) and including members of the ABC was brokered; it took power on 12 August 1933 amidst a general strike in Havana.

Carlos Manuel de Céspedes y Quesada subsequently was offered the position of President by ambassador Sumner Welles. He took office on 12 August 1933, and Welles proposed that "general elections may be held approximately 3 months from now so that Cuba may once more have a constitutional government in the real sense of the word." Céspedes agreed, and declared that a general election would be held on 24 February 1934, for a new presidential term to begin on 20 May 1934. However, on 4-5 September 1933, the Sergeants' Revolt took place while Céspedes was in Matanzas and Santa Clara after a hurricane had ravaged those regions. The junta of officers led by Sergeant Fulgencio Batista and students proclaimed that it had taken power in order to fulfill the aims of the revolution; it briefly described a program which included economic restructuring, punishment of wrongdoers, recognition of public debts, creation of courts, political reorganization, and any other actions necessary to construct a new Cuba based on justice and democracy. Only five days after the coup, Batista and the Student Directory promoted Ramón Grau to the role of President. The ensuing One Hundred Days Government issued a number of reformist declarations but never gained diplomatic recognition from the US; it was overthrown in January 1934 under pressure from Batista and the US ambassador. Grau was replaced by Carlos Mendieta, and within five days the U.S. recognized Cuba's new government. The corruption was not curtailed under Mendieta and he resigned in 1935 after unrest continued, and their followed a number of interim and weak presidents under the guidance of Batista and the US. Batista, supported by the Democratic Socialist Coalition which included Julio Antonio Mella's Communist Party, defeated Grau in the first presidential election under the new Cuban constitution in the 1940 election, and served a four-year term as President of Cuba. Batista was endorsed by the original Communist Party of Cuba (later known as the Popular Socialist Party), which at the time had little significance and no probability of an electoral victory. This support was primarily due to Batista's labor laws and his support for labor unions, with which the Communists had close ties. In fact, Communists attacked the anti-Batista opposition, saying Grau and others were "fascists" and "reactionaries".

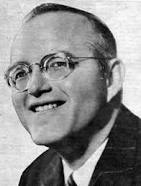
Senator and anti-corruption crusader Eduardo René Chibás Ribas in 1950

Senator Eduardo Chibás dedicated himself to exposing corruption in the Cuban government, and formed the Partido Ortodoxo in 1947 to further this aim. Argote-Freyre points out that Cuba's population under the Republic had a high tolerance for corruption. Furthermore, Cubans knew and criticized who was corrupt, but admired them for their ability to act as "criminals with impunity". Corrupt officials went beyond members of congress to also include military officials who granted favours to residents and accepted bribes. The establishment of an illegal gambling network within the military enabled army personnel such as Lieutenant Colonel Pedraza and Major Mariné to engage in extensive illegal gambling activities. Mauricio Augusto Font and Alfonso Quiroz, authors of The Cuban Republic and José Martí, say that corruption "pervaded in political life" under the administrations of Presidents Ramón Grau and Carlos Prío Socarrás. Prío was reported to have stolen over $90 million in public funds, which was equivalent to one fourth of the annual national budget. Prior to the Communist revolution, Cuba was ruled under the elected government of Fulgencio Batista from 1940 to 1944. Throughout this time period, Batista's support base consisted mainly of corrupt politicians and military officials. Batista himself was able to heavily profit from the regime before coming into power through inflated government contracts and gambling proceeds. In 1942, the British Foreign Office reported that the U.S. State Department was "very worried" about corruption under President Fulgencio Batista, describing the problem as "endemic" and exceeding "anything which had gone on previously". British diplomats believed that corruption was rooted within Cuba's most powerful institutions, with the highest individuals in government and military being heavily involved in gambling and the drug trade. In terms of civil society, Eduardo Saenz Rovner writes that corruption within the police and government enabled the expansion of criminal organizations in Cuba. Batista refused U.S. President Franklin Roosevelt's offer to send experts to help reform the Cuban Civil Service. Batista didn't run in the 1944 election, and Partido Auténtico party member Ramón Grau was elected president, and oversaw extensive corruption during his administration. He had Carlos Prío Socarrás serve turns as Minister of Public Works, Minister of Labor and Prime Minister. On the next election 1 July 1948, Prío was elected president of Cuba as a member of the Partido Auténtico which presided over corruption and irresponsible government of this period. Prío was assisted by Chief of the Armed Forces General Genobebo Pérez Dámera and Colonel José Luis Chinea Cardenas, who had previously been in charge of the province of Santa Clara.

Later in 1952, Batista led a U.S.-backed military coup against Prío Socarrás and ruled until 1959. Under his rule, Batista led a corrupt dictatorship that involved close links with organized crime organizations and the reduction of the civil freedoms of Cubans. This period resulted in Bastista engaging in more "sophisticated practices of corruption" at both the administrative and civil society levels. Batista and his administration engaged in profiteering from the lottery as well as illegal gambling. Corruption further flourished in civil society through increasing amounts of police corruption, censorship of the press as well as media, and creating anti-communist campaigns that suppressed opposition with violence, torture and public executions. The former culture of toleration and acceptance towards corruption also dissolved with the dictatorship of Batista. For instance, one citizen wrote that "however corrupt Grau and Prío were, we elected them and therefore allowed them to steal from us. Batista robs us without our permission.” Corruption under Batista further expanded into the economic sector with alliances that he forged with foreign investors and the prevalence of illegal casinos and criminal organizations in the country's capital, Havana.

=== Post-Revolution ===
For more information: Cuban Revolution

Corruption in the Batista government has been cited as a key factor that led to his overthrow in 1959. Despite the United States' initial support of Batista, John F. Kennedy stated in 1961 that,

"The character of the Batista regime in Cuba made a violent popular reaction almost inevitable. The rapacity of the leadership, the corruption of the government, the brutality of the police, the regime's indifference to the needs of the people for education, medical care, housing, for social justice and economic opportunity-all these, in Cuba as elsewhere, constituted an open invitation to revolution."

Once the Communist Party of Cuba took control of the government, Fidel Castro immediately began to eliminate all remnants of the former batistiano system that was seen as highly corrupt. This involved executing several dozen batistianos and calling for the confiscation of the wealth of corrupt officials, among other actions. In 1959, Fidel Castro issued a series of law decrees that enabled the confiscation of private property in addition to funds that were previously controlled by Batista and his collaborators. The Cuban government thus transformed from a corrupt military dictatorship to a single-party socialist state.

Despite their efforts to rid Cuba of any former corruption that persisted under Batista, Sergio Diaz-Briquets and Jorge F. Pérez-López, in the book Corruption in Cuba, argue that the government of Fidel and Raúl Castro institutionalized corruption with government monopolies, cronyism, and lack of accountability. Moreover, Daniel Erikson writes that Castro's control of economic resources transformed Cuba into "the most captured state in Latin America" and suggests that corruption might have increased, rather than decreased, after the Cuban Revolution. While the state has no tolerance for political or economic opposition to the government, a system of special advantages evolved for high-ranking members of the Cuban nomenklatura and the military, as they were able to enjoy privileges that were unavailable to ordinary citizens. The nomenklatura, a term adopted by the former Soviet Union, referred to a list of key positions and appointments within the government made by the Communist Party. This privileged group of political elites was particularly subject to corruption due to their access to state resources. As such, the nomenklatura were able to benefit from certain privileges that are not available to the general public, including, but not limited to, being exempt from the rationing system, obtaining imported foods and consumer goods, gaining access to better housing as well as special hospitals and medications, and having the ability to travel abroad. The Cuban nomenklatura were also referred to as pinchos, pinchos grandes, or mayimbes.

==== Cuba's Socialist Economy and Corruption ====
By 1968, the Cuban state had nationalized 100% of the industry, construction, transportation, retail trade, wholesale and foreign trade, banking and education. By 1988, they further controlled 92% of the state's agriculture. As a result of their large share of ownership, measuring corruption in Cuba proves to be difficult. Citizens have limited possibilities to appeal against arbitrary or take actions against instances of unjust government action. However, as Pérez-López writes, there is some available information on Cuba's corrupt activities regarding former black market operations, the misuse of office and presence of the Cuban nomenklatura. Other forms of corrupt behaviour such as paying bribes were likely present, but are much more difficult to measure. Professor Esteban Morales Domínguez also states that the illegal market in Cuba's economy was able to emerge due to "large imbalances between supply and demand" that result in "hidden leaders" offering alternatives to state resources and services.

On a micro-level, corruption under the socialist economy involved ordinary citizens engaging in acts of petty corruption in everyday life. Díaz-Briquets and Pérez-López have argued that the socialist economy resulted in the rise of social attitudes that condone taking advantage of inequalities in income and assets for personal benefit. This was mainly developed through the confiscation of private assets and expropriation of personal property. As a result, they suggest that the scarcity of goods and services resulted in the widespread prevalence of petty corruption and crimes. On the other hand, Mark Kruger states that Cuba has had one of the lowest crime rates in Latin America and the Caribbean, specifically referencing the low rates of domestic violence and violence against women. Nonetheless, theft from the state sector became the main source of resources and products that entered the black market in Cuba. One Cuban attorney from a cigar factory described the petty theft issue as individuals "faced with shortages of food and basic consumer-products, workers steal from the workplaces where something is made in order to ease their needs." Other instances of documented theft included stealing bottles of rum, beer, slaughtering stolen cattle, stealing cigarette papers, and more.

From a government standpoint, public officials in Cuba largely engaged in corrupt practices through the diversion of state resources for personal gains and taking bribes in return for discussing benefits. For example, one scandal broke out in which a manager of the Antonio Guiteras sugar mill had used construction materials to build his own personal pig pen outside of his home. Through a centrally planned economy, the lack of independent civil society organizations and a government controlled press, Klitgaard suggests that this created the perfect conditions under a socialist society for which corruption could flourish. Cuban government officials were able to enjoy privileges possessed by few others along with a low degree of accountability for their actions and control over the supply of goods and services.

In the 1990s, corruption changed its form and visibility due to the changing economic structures that enabled more space for the private sector. Jorge Dominguez thus writes that the marketization of the economy in the 1990s contributed to corruption through the "interaction of state and economy" despite its limited nature. New opportunities for corruption were created due to the lack of legal institutions and property rights to account for the transitioning economy. The new economic system of the 1990s in Cuba included new, limited opportunities for self-employment in newly private industries such as restaurants. However, due to the scarcity of these jobs, a large proportion of the Cuban population resorted to working in the black market and underground economy. Cuban citizens further depended on black markets for access to basic resources that exhibit high costs under state-led businesses.

==== Sociolismo ====
Sociolismo is the informal term used in Cuba to describe the reciprocal exchange of favours by individuals, usually relating to circumventing bureaucratic restrictions or obtaining hard-to-find goods. Ramón de la Cruz Ochoa, Cuba's General Prosecutor of the Republic, stated that he viewed sociolismo as one of the main corruption problems in Cuba. This system involves rewarding friends and family of government officials and generally results in individuals disregarding the rule of law. Gary Marx wrote that "in cash-poor Cuba, connections are as good as currency" and thus the system of sociolismo is able to flourish. Furthermore, sociolismo expanded into daily life as it involved maintaining relationships with individuals that had access to resources. Personal ties are used in Cuba in nearly every aspect of daily life, from receiving extra food that is rationed by the government to securing spaces in schools for children. In relation to sociolismo, Fernández also uses the term lo informal to refer to the behavioural patterns involving likability (simpatia), familiarity that leads to trust (confianza), and being a nice person (ser buena gente) that serve to create informal networks and bypass legal norms. In turn, participation in lo informal results in individuals engaging in a "culture of illegality" and becoming accustomed to breaking the law. In terms of the word's origin, it is derived from the Spanish word socio which means business partner or buddy, and is a pun on socialismo, the Spanish term for socialism. It is analogous to the blat of the Soviet Union.

=== Cuba in the 21st Century: Combatting Corruption ===
Erikson identifies the control of corruption as one of the main obstacles that Cuba must overcome in order to transition successfully away from authoritarian rule to democracy. The Cuba Transition Project (CTP) has aimed to propose anti-corruption policies as an important component of a greater transition strategy for Cuba. In 2001, the Cuban Government set up a Ministry for Auditing and Control to investigate corruption and improve efficiency in the Cuban economy. However, Lopez and Diaz-Briquets have pointed out that this system relies upon transparency and accountability in order to function, which is lacking in Cuba through their tendencies to hide budgetary and financial information. A BBC News article stated that foreign businessmen in Cuba said levels of corruption were lower than in most other countries in Latin America. BBC says that "Inspectors went to thousands of state-run enterprises and consistently found customers being short-changed. The offences included beer mugs being only partially filled, taxi rides being charged at almost five times the going rate, government price lists being hidden, even shoe repairers charging vastly inflated rates."

Fidel Castro announced in 2005 his new efforts to root out cases of corruption and avoid maldistribution of government goods and services. This included a major housing initiative that involved the participation of local governments and citizens as a strategy to prevent corrupt practices and maximize the benefits of the housing program. Castro later promised in the same year to embark on a battle against theft, immoral conduct and misuse of government resources. After Raúl Castro took power in 2006, over 10 corruption scandals have been uncovered and several public servants were arrested. In 2008, Raúl Castro's government led additional initiatives to crack down on possible corruption cases through auditing and inspections. This led to the conviction of Rogelio Acevedo who had leased Cuba's airline's planes and was found with millions of dollars' worth of cash in his home. Raúl Castro later created the Office of the Comptroller General to fight corruption after stating that corruption risked destroying Cuba's "values and morality and it corrodes our institutions." Among other convictions, high-level employees from the Tourist Agency Sol y Son as well as the food company Río Zaza were arrested for fraud and bribery. Both companies were said to have had ties to a previously arrested corrupt businessman and close friend of Fidel Castro.

== See also ==
- International Anti-Corruption Academy
- Group of States Against Corruption
- International Anti-Corruption Day
- ISO 37001 Anti-bribery management systems
- United Nations Convention against Corruption
- OECD Anti-Bribery Convention
- Transparency International

== Bibliography ==
- Diaz-Briquets, Sergio; Pérez-López, Jorge F. (1 October 2006). Corruption in Cuba: Castro and Beyond. Austin, Texas: University of Texas Press. ISBN 978-0-292-71482-3. OCLC 64098477.
- Thomas, Hugh (2013). Cuba: La Lucha por La Libertad [Cuba or the Pursuit of Freedom] (in Spanish). Translated by Daurella, Neri (Primera edición Vintage español ed.). New York: Vintage Español, Random House. ISBN 978-0-345-80424-2. OCLC 796761533.
- Chapman, Charles E. (February 1927). A History of the Cuban Republic: A Study in Hispanic American Politics. New York: The Macmillan Company. OCLC 1361423667.
- Schwartz, Rosalie (1997). Pleasure Island: Tourism and Temptation in Cuba. Lincoln, Nebraska: University of Nebraska Press. ISBN 978-0-585-30061-0. OCLC 45733547.
- Aguilar, Luis E. (1972). Cuba 1933: Prologue to Revolution. Ithaca, New York: Cornell University Press. ISBN 978-0-801-40660-7. OCLC 226154.
- Hunt, Michael H., ed. (27 June 2014) [1st ed. pub. 2004]. The World Transformed, 1945 to the Present: A Documentary Reader (2nd ed.). Oxford University Press. ISBN 978-0-199-37103-7.
- Font, Mauricio A.; Quiroz, Alfonso W., eds. (December 2005). The Cuban Republic and José Martí: Reception and Use of a National Symbol. Lanham, Maryland: Lexington Books. ISBN 978-0-7391-1225-0. OCLC 61179604.
- Martínez-Fernández, Luis (16 September 2014). Revolutionary Cuba: A History. Gainesville, Florida: University Press of Florida. ISBN 978-0-8130-4997-7. LCCN 2014937647. OCLC 896824646.
- Sáenz Rovner, Eduardo (June 2009) [First published in Spanish by the Universidad Nacional de Colombia Colección CES as La conexión cubana: Narcotráfico, contrabando y juego en Cuba entre los años 20 y comienzos de la Revolución in 2005]. The Cuban Connection: Drug Trafficking, Smuggling, and Gambling in Cuba from the 1920s to the Revolution. Translated by Davidson, Russ. Chapel Hill, North Carolina: University of North Carolina Press. ISBN 978-0-8078-8858-2. OCLC 401386259.
- Chomsky, Aviva; Carr, Barry; Prieto, Alfredo; Smorkaloff, Pamela Maria, eds. (May 2019). The Cuba Reader: History, Culture, Politics. The Latin America Readers (2nd ed.). Durham, North Carolina: Duke University Press. doi:10.1215/9781478004561. ISBN 978-1-4780-0393-9. OCLC 1084624854.
- Masó y Vázquez, Calixto (1976). Historia de Cuba: La Lucha de un Pueblo Por Cumplir Su Destino Historico y Su Vocacion de Libertad. Colección Colección Cuba y Sus Jueces (in Spanish) (2nd ed.). Miami, Florida: Ediciones Universal. ISBN 978-0-897-29875-9. OCLC 2789690.
- Hudson, Rex A., ed. (April 2001). Cuba: A Country Study (PDF). Area Handbook series (4th ed.). Washington, D.C.: Federal Research Division, Library of Congress. ISBN 0-8444-1045-4. ISSN 1057-5294. LCCN 2002018893. Archived (PDF) from the original on 18 September 2024.
