= 1939 Cuban Constitutional Assembly election =

Constitutional Assembly elections were held in Cuba on 15 November 1939. The result was a victory for the Opposition Front, which won 41 of the 76 seats.

== Results ==
Party or alliance		Votes	%	Seats
Opposition Front	Partido Auténtico	225,223	20.67	18
Opposition Front	Republican Democratic Party	170,681	15.67	15
Opposition Front	Republican Action	80,168	7.36	4
Opposition Front	ABC	65,842	6.04	4
Opposition Front	National Agrarian Party	9,359	0.86	0
Opposition Front	Total	551,273	50.61	41
Government Front	Liberal Party	182,246	16.73	16
Government Front	Nationalist Union	132,189	12.13	9
Government Front	Communist Revolutionary Union	97,944	8.99	6
Government Front	Democratic National Association	77,527	7.12	3
Government Front	Revolutionary National Party	37,933	3.48	1
Government Front	Cuban Popular Party	10,251	0.94	0
Government Front	Total	538,090	49.39	35
Total		1,089,363	100.00	76
Registered voters/turnout		1,940,434	–	
Source: Nohlen
