= 1948 Cuban general election =

- 1 June 1948
- Presidential election
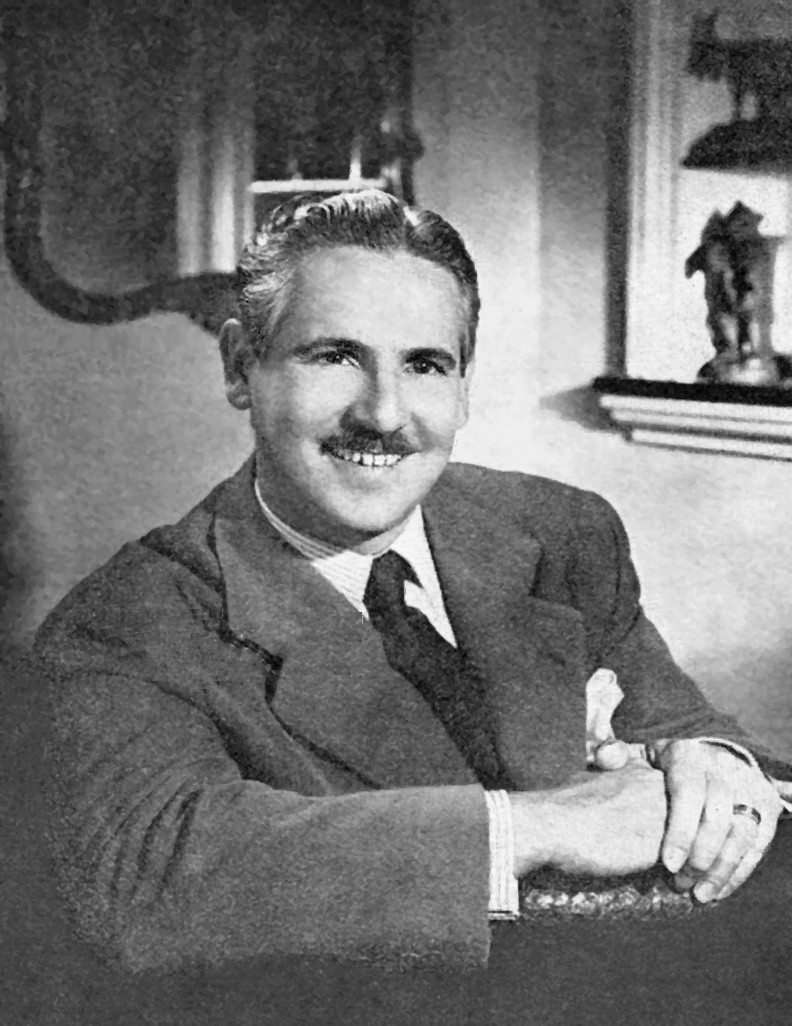

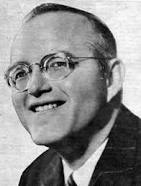

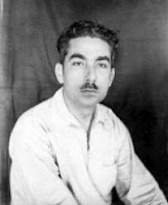
Nominee	Carlos Prío Socarrás	Ricardo Núñez Portuondo
Party	Auténtico	Liberal
Popular vote	905,198	599,364
Nominee	Eduardo Chibás	Juan Marinello
Party	Ortodoxo	Popular Socialist
Popular vote	324,364	142,972
- Results by province
President before election
Ramón Grau
Auténtico
Elected President
Carlos Prío Socarrás
Auténtico

General elections were held in Cuba on 1 June 1948. Carlos Prío Socarrás won the presidential election running under the Auténtico-Republican Alliance banner, whilst the Partido Auténtico emerged as the largest party in the House of Representatives, winning 29 of the 70 seats. Voter turnout was 78%.

The next elections were scheduled to be held on 1 June 1952, but former president Fulgencio Batista seized power in the 1952 Cuban coup d'état on 10 March 1952.

== Opinion polls ==
Survey	Date	Prío	Núñez	Chibás	Marinello	No answer
University of Havana	May 1948	38.45	28.19	15.65	6.20	11.51

== Results ==
=== President ===
Candidate	Party	Votes	%
Carlos Prío Socarrás	Auténtico–Republican Alliance	905,198	
Ricardo Núñez Portuondo	Liberal–Democratic Coalition	599,364	
Eduardo Chibás	Partido Ortodoxo	324,634	
Juan Marinello	Popular Socialist Party	142,972	
Total			
Total votes		1,972,705	–
Registered voters/turnout		2,506,734	78.70
Source: Nohlen

=== Senate ===
Party	Seats
Auténtico–Republican Alliance	36
Liberal–Democratic Coalition	18
Total	54
Source: Nohlen

=== House of Representatives ===
Party	Seats
Partido Auténtico	29
Liberal Party of Cuba	15
Republican Party	11
Democratic Party	6
Popular Socialist Party	5
Partido Ortodoxo	4
Total	70
Source: Nohlen
