= Carlos Prio-Touzet =

Cuban-born American architect

- Born: 5 February 1955 (age 71); Havana, Cuba

Carlos Prio-Touzet (born 5 February 1955 in Havana, Cuba) is an architect in Miami, Florida. He is the son of Cuban President, Carlos Prio, who was overthrown by Fulgencio Batista in the 1952 Cuban coup d'état, and Celia Rosa Touzet Masfera (born 1929).

== Background ==
He received a Bachelor of Arts from Princeton University and a Bachelor of Architecture from the University of Miami. He has been a designer and vice president for such firms as ADD Inc, Arquitectonica, Sasaki, and Spillis Candela. He has designed buildings in Europe, Asia and the United States.

Prio-Touzet has received the Florida American Institute of Architects (AIA) Unbuilt Award of Merit 2006 and the Miami-American Institute of Architects Award of Excellence 2005. His more notable projects include The Setai Miami Beach, a 37-story condominium/hotel completed in 2004 on Miami Beach, Florida; the Vitri, a mixed use development on Miami Beach that was scheduled to be completed in 2007; Lime Tree Bay Development, a luxury residential development in the Florida Keys; and the NE 11 Street project, a 44-story residential building that was to be built in 2008 in Miami, Florida.

== Personal life ==
Prio-Touzet is married to fellow Cuban American architect and designer Jacqueline Gonzalez Touzet, with whom he co-founded Touzet Studio in 2004.

== Additional sources ==
- Town & Country magazine, January 2006, Page 102
- Ocean Drive en Espaňol magazine, Fall/Winter 2005, Page 72 (in Spanish)
- New York Living magazine, November 2005, Page 34
- Florida Inside Out magazine, March 2007, Page 66
- Florida/Caribbean Architect magazine, Summer 2005, Page 34
- Ocean Drive magazine, June 2005, Page 216
- Anuario Social de la Habana 1939, (Luz - Hilo S.A.) (in Spanish)
- Libro de Oro de la Sociedad Habanera, (Editorial Lex, 1950) (in Spanish)
- http://www.aia.org/aiarchitect/thismonth/0401pf/0401c4members.pdf
- http://www.bizjournals.com/southflorida/stories/2005/05/02/daily11.html
- http://www.banderasnews.com/0608/nw-miamicheers.htm
- https://web.archive.org/web/20070219214436/http://www.miamisunpost.com/archives/2006/08-10-06/art%20review.htm
- https://web.archive.org/web/20070928203643/http://www.thereznikgroup.com/vitri.html
- https://web.archive.org/web/20070930105955/http://www.thecondosgroupofmiami.com/VITRI.html
- https://web.archive.org/web/20071007110638/http://www.wheretogonext.com/2006release.php?releaseID=110917
