= 1946 Cuban parliamentary election =

Parliamentary elections were held in Cuba on 1 June 1946. The Partido Auténtico emerged as the largest party, with 30 of the 66 seats in the House of Representatives.

== Results ==
Party	Seats
Partido Auténtico	30
Liberal Party of Cuba	11
Democratic Party	10
Republican Party	7
Popular Socialist Party	5
ABC	3
Total	66
Source: Nohlen
