= Partido Auténtico =

1934–1959 political party in Cuba

Authentic Party Partido Auténtico
- President (s): Ramón Grau (1934–1948); Carlos Prío Socarrás (1948–1959)
- Founded: 8 February 1934
- Dissolved: 1 January 1959
- Preceded by: Cuban Revolutionary Party (not legal predecessor)
- Headquarters: Havana, Cuba
- Youth wing: Juventud Auténtica
- Ideology: Cuban nationalism Left-wing nationalism Economic nationalism Liberal nationalism Corporatism; Left-wing populism Social democracy
- Political position: Centre-left to left-wing
- Colors: Blue, red, white (Cuban national colours)
- Slogan: Cuba para los Cubanos (Cuba for the Cubans)

The Cuban Revolutionary Party – Authentic (Spanish: Partido Revolucionario Cubano – Auténtico, PRC-A), commonly called the Authentic Party (Spanish: Partido Auténtico, PA), was a political party in Cuba most active between 1934 and 1952. Although the Partido Auténtico had significant influence, it eventually became unpopular due to corruption scandals and, despite significant reforms, Fulgencio Batista returned to power after a coup d’etat.

== History ==
The Partido Auténtico had its origins in the nationalist Revolution of 1933. It was made up in February 1934 by many of the same individuals who had brought about the downfall of Gerardo Machado in the previous year to defend the changes caused by the Revolution of 1933.

In the 1939 Constitutional Assembly election the party was part of the victorious Opposition Front, and it emerged as the largest party in the Assembly. The 1940 Constitution of Cuba was heavily influenced by the nationalist ideas at the heart of the party's program.

Although the party also held the most seats in the Chamber of Representatives after the 1940 general election, its candidate, Ramón Grau, lost the presidential election. In the 1942 parliamentary election it finished third, winning only 10 seats. Grau went on to win the presidency at the 1944 general election, which also saw the Partido Auténtico win the most seats in the Chamber. The party also won the 1946 mid-term election with 30 seats. On May 15, 1947, in response to government corruption and lack of reform, a faction led by Eduardo Chibás split to form the Partido Ortodoxo with the primary aims of establishing a distinct national identity, economic independence and the implementation of social reforms.

For the 1948 general election the party formed an alliance with the Republican Party, helping Carlos Prío Socarrás win the presidency, and also winning both the Chamber and Senate. A different alliance with the Democratic Party and the Liberal Party was formed for the 1950 mid-term election, and this alliance too won. However, the Partido Auténtico lost the 1954 general election to Fulgencio Batista's National Progressive Coalition. The Partido Auténtico was later abolished by the Communist Party of Cuba under Fidel Castro in 1959.

== Ideology ==
The Partido Auténtico was the most nationalistic of the major parties that existed between the Revolution of 1933 and the 1959 Cuban Revolution. It had as its slogan Cuba para los cubanos ("Cuba for Cubans").

Its electoral program contained corporatist elements. For instance, it supported numerous efforts to strengthen the power of the labor unions, some of the party's biggest supporters. Also, some of its members supported the management of the economy through tripartite commissions with businessmen, labor leaders and government bureaucrats, as well as a second chamber (River Plate) with labor and business groups.

== Notable members ==
- Ramón Grau
- Carlos Prío Socarrás
- Eduardo Chibás
- Nicolás Castellanos
- Manuel Antonio de Varona
- Rafael García Bárcena
- Aureliano Sánchez Arango
- Carlos Hevia
- Rolando Masferrer
- Félix Lancís Sánchez
- Raúl López del Castillo
- Gilberto Goliath
- Manuel Penabaz Solorzano
- Manuel Aran

== Electoral results ==
House of Representatives
Election year	# of overall votes	% of overall vote	# of overall seats won	+/–	Leader
1936	unknown (#1)	unknown	90 / 162	–	Ramón Grau
1939	225,223 (#1)	20.7	18 / 76	▼72	Ramón Grau
1940	unknown (#1)	unknown	34 / 162	▲14	Ramón Grau
1942	unknown (#3)	unknown	10 / 57	▼24	Ramón Grau
1944	unknown (#3)	unknown	19 / 70	▲9	Félix Lancís Sánchez
1946	unknown (#1)	unknown	30 / 66	▲11	Raúl López del Castillo
1948	unknown (#1)	unknown	29 / 70	▼1	Manuel Antonio de Varona
1950	unknown (#1)	unknown	42 / 66	▲13	Manuel Antonio de Varona
