= 1942 Cuban parliamentary election =

Parliamentary elections were held in Cuba on 15 March 1942. The Liberal Party and the Democratic Party both won 21 seats in the House of Representatives.

== Results ==
Party	Votes	%	Seats
Liberal Party of Cuba			21
Democratic Party			21
Partido Auténtico			10
Communist Revolutionary Union			3
ABC			2
Total			57
Registered voters/turnout	1,977,001	–	
Source: Nohlen
