= Emilio Ochoa =

Cuban dentist and politician (1907–2007)

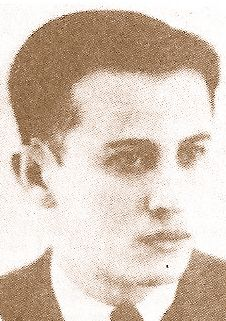
- Emilio Ochoa about 1940
- Born: Emilio Ochoa y Ochoa; July 4, 1907; Holguín, Cuba
- Died: June 27, 2007 (aged 99); Miami, Florida, U.S.

Emilio Ochoa (born Emilio Ochoa y Ochoa; July 4, 1907 – June 27, 2007) was a Cuban dentist and politician. Believed to be the last living signatory of Cuba's 1940 Constitution, he served as Senator (1940–1948) and became part of the opposition against both Fulgencio Batista and Fidel Castro, ultimately going into exile in the 1960s.

== Biography ==
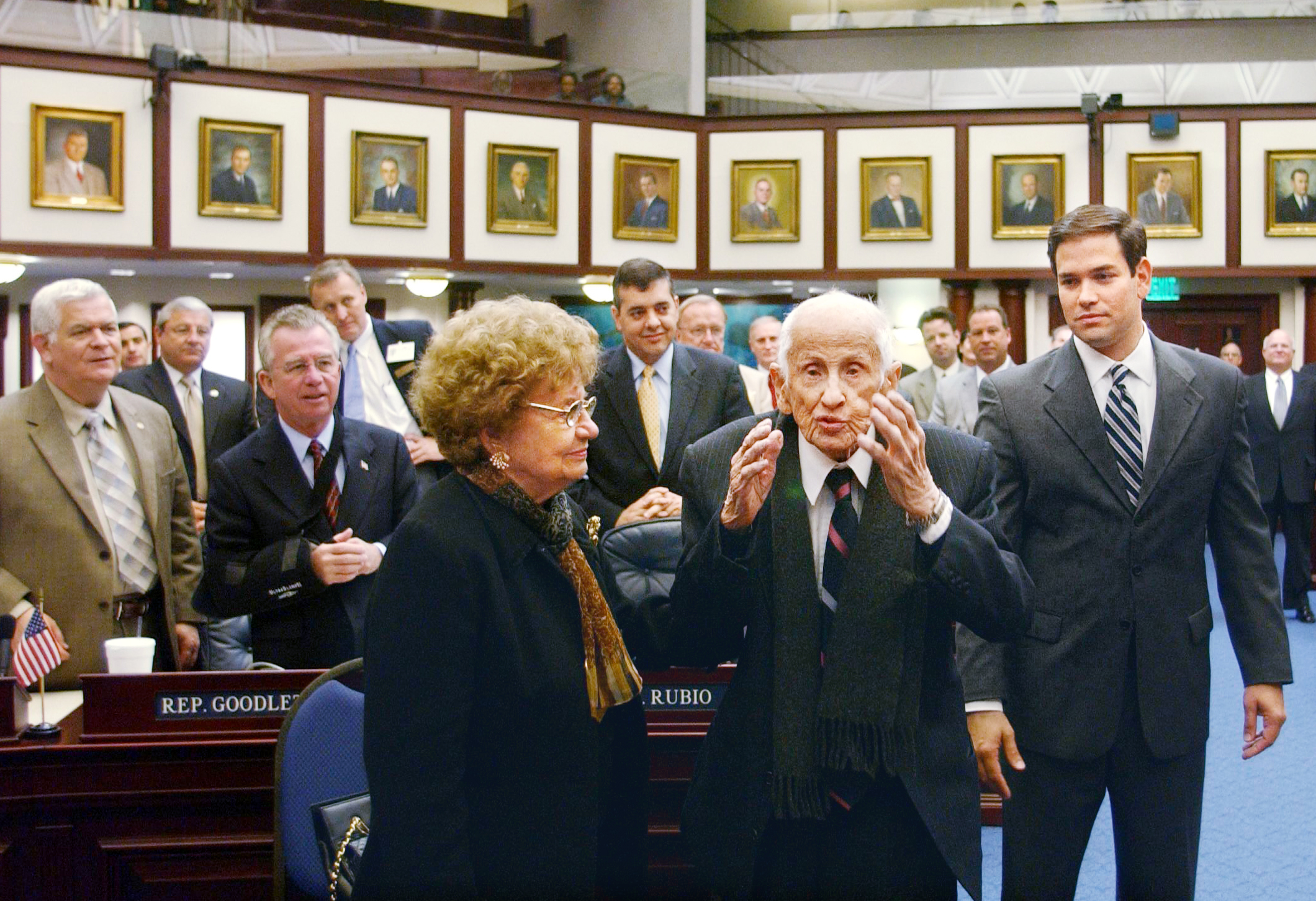
Ochoa speaks to members of the Florida House of Representatives on March 15, 2006

Dr. Ochoa was one of seven children in a poor family. He studied dentistry in Havana and graduated in 1937. During this time he became involved in politics and was one of the delegates of the Partido Auténtico to the constitutional convention which wrote the Cuban Constitution of 1940.

Dr. Ochoa helped found two political parties: the Partido Autentico in 1934 and the Partido Ortodoxo in 1947. Ochoa was first elected as a Senator in 1940 and served in that office until 1948. He was opposed to Fulgencio Batista, who suspended the Cuban Constitution of 1940 following a coup d'état in 1952.

Dr. Ochoa was arrested 32 times because of his political beliefs and went into exile in 1960, following the takeover of the country by Fidel Castro, who had formerly been a member of the Partido Ortodoxo. However, he returned to Cuba in 1961, hoping that Cuba's 1940 Constitution would be reinstituted following the Bay of Pigs invasion. However, the revolutionary government stayed in power and Ochoa left Cuba for good years later.

He first went to Venezuela where he practiced dentistry until 1965 when he went to the United States. During the academic years beginning in fall of 1968 and 1969, Dr. Ochoa taught Spanish at Pender Public High School in Pender, Nebraska. He also taught at Wayne State College in Nebraska and then at a Catholic school in Chicago. In 1971, he moved to Miami and lived in government-subsidized apartment.

In the 1980s, he practiced dentistry with the Miami Medical Team that traveled to Nicaragua to help the Contras fighting the Sandinistas.

In 1933, he married Domitila Nunez (died 1969) and they had two children, Pura America and Carlos Emilio Ochoa Nunez (died 1996). In 1986 he married Martha Herrera.

Ochoa died of cardiac arrest at his home in Miami on June 27, 2007, one week short of his 100th birthday. He is buried at Flagler Memorial Park.
