= 1950 Cuban parliamentary election =

Parliamentary elections were held in Cuba on 1 June 1950. The Partido Auténtico-Democratic Party-Liberal Party alliance won 42 of the 66 seats. It was the last free election held in Cuba on a national level.

== Results ==
Party or alliance		Seats
PA–PD–PL; Alliance	Partido Auténtico	28
PA–PD–PL; Alliance	Liberal Party of Cuba	8
PA–PD–PL; Alliance	Democratic Party	6
Partido Ortodoxo		9
Republican Party		7
Progressive Action		4
Popular Socialist Party		4
Unitary Action Party		4
Total		70
Source: Nohlen
