= Partido Ortodoxo =

Party of the Cuban People – Orthodox Partido del Pueblo Cubano – Ortodoxos
- Leader: Eduardo Chibás; Emilio Ochoa
- Founded: 15 May 1947
- Dissolved: 1952
- Split from: Authentic Party
- Headquarters: Havana
- Newspaper: CMQ Radio (FM)
- Youth wing: Orthodox Youth (Juventud Ortodoxa)
- Ideology: Left-wing populism Direct democracy Anti-corruption; Progressivism; Anti-imperialism (Note: Mainly Anti-Americanism and left-wing, economic, nationalism.); Agrarian reform Free market economics Social corporatism Reformism; Socialism; Factions: Democratic socialism Classical liberalism
- Political position: Centre-left to left-wing
- Colors: Black
- Slogan: "Shame against money" (Vergüenza contra dinero)

The Party of the Cuban People – Orthodox (Spanish: Partido del Pueblo Cubano – Ortodoxos, PPC-O), commonly shortened to the Orthodox Party (Partido Ortodoxo), was a Cuban left-wing populist political party. It was founded in 1947 by Eduardo Chibás in response to government corruption and lack of reform. Its primary aims were the establishment of a distinct national identity, economic independence and the implementation of social reforms.

== History ==
In the 1948 general elections Chibás came third in the presidential election, whilst the party won four seats in the House of Representatives. In the 1950 mid-term elections they won nine. Chibás' cousin, Roberto Agramonte, was the favorite to win the 1952 election (for the Ortodoxos) but Fulgencio Batista staged a coup almost three months before the election.

Fidel Castro was an active member of the PPC-O in the late 1940s and early 1950s. He intended to run as a PPC-O candidate for the Cuban parliament prior to Batista's coup.

== Ideology and platform ==
The PPC-O was a centre-left to left-wing reformist party, open to all that wanted join to it. Generally left-wing populist, there were not distinct internal factions or organizations, with all members united by their support of Eduardo Chibás' goals and ideals. The party's composition included several ideological groups ranging from the political centre to the far-left:

- Former members of the Authentic Party: staunch nationalists, supporting anti-imperialism and revolutionary goals
- Former members of the Popular Socialist Party: young socialists and communist soldiers, disappointed by their party's misconduct
- Former members of the Liberal Party of Cuba: petite bourgeoisie, with more pro-business views

The political program reflected PPC-O's catch-all nature, claiming support for:

- Direct democracy
- A multi-party political system
- The fight against political corruption, embezzlement and criminals
- Progressivism
- Anti-imperialism (mainly anti-Americanism) and left-wing, economic, nationalism
- Agrarian reform: Abolition of latifundios and monoculture, agricultural diversification
- Fair payments and economic redistribution
- Nationalization of railways, power plants, and telecommunications
- The free market and respect for private ownership
- Social corporatism and labor rights

The left-wing of the PPC-O had its most influence in the party's youth wing, the Orthodox Youth (Juventud Ortodoxa). A 1948 pamphlet by the Orthodox Youth espoused a Marxist-inspired, democratic socialist platform; however, it was also critical of the Soviet-aligned Popular Socialist Party, which upheld Marxism–Leninism.
