= 1944 Cuban general election =

- 1 June 1944
- Presidential election
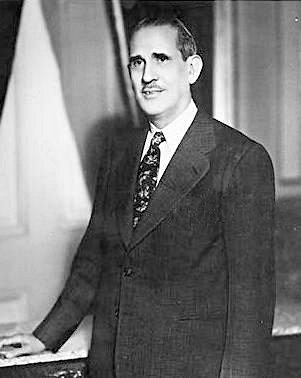

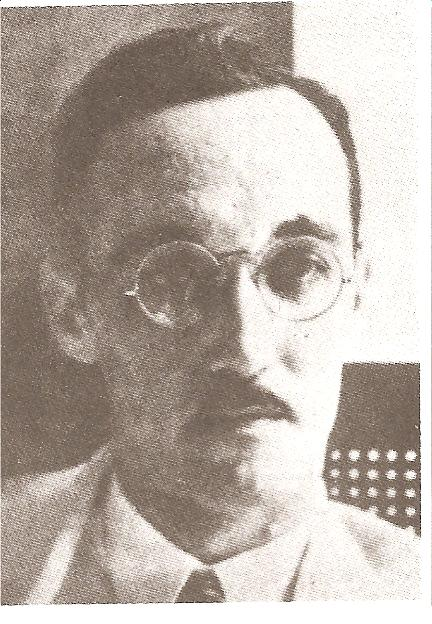
Nominee	Ramón Grau	Carlos Saladrigas Zayas
Party	Auténtico	CSD
Popular vote	1,041,822	839,220
President before election
Fulgencio Batista
CSD
Elected President
Ramón Grau
Auténtico

General elections were held in Cuba on 1 June 1944. Ramón Grau San Martín won the presidential election running under the Auténtico-Republican Alliance banner, whilst the Partido Auténtico emerged as the largest party in the House of Representatives, winning 19 of the 70 seats.

== Results ==
=== President ===
Candidate	Party	Votes	%
Ramón Grau	Auténtico–Republican Alliance	1,041,822	
Carlos Saladrigas Zayas	Democratic Socialist Coalition	839,220	
Total			
Registered voters/turnout		2,330,021	–
Source: Nohlen

=== Senate ===
Party or alliance		Seats
Democratic Socialist Coalition	Liberal Party of Cuba	13
Democratic Socialist Coalition	Democratic Party	10
Democratic Socialist Coalition	ABC	4
Democratic Socialist Coalition	Socialist	3
Auténtico–Republican Alliance	Partido Auténtico	17
Auténtico–Republican Alliance	Republican Party	7
Total		54
Source: Nohlen

=== House of Representatives ===
Party or alliance		Seats
Democratic Socialist Coalition	Liberal Party of Cuba	18
Democratic Socialist Coalition	Democratic Party	17
Democratic Socialist Coalition	ABC	4
Democratic Socialist Coalition	Socialist	4
Auténtico–Republican Alliance	Partido Auténtico	19
Auténtico–Republican Alliance	Republican Party	8
Total		70
Source: Nohlen
