= LJC =

LJC may refer to:

- Liberty Justice Center, an American nonpartisan, nonprofit public interest law firm in the United States
- Loyola Jesuit College, a private Catholic secondary boarding school, located in Gidan Mangoro, Abuja, Nigeria
- Young Communist League (Cuba, 1928), a youth organization in Cuba
