= Popular Socialist Youth =

Cuban youth organization; part of the Popular Socialist Party

The Popular Socialist Youth (Spanish: Juventud Socialista Popular) was a youth organization in Cuba, the youth wing of the Popular Socialist Party. Raúl Valdés Vivó was the general secretary of the organization. By 1960, the organization was estimated to have around 13,000 members. Raúl Castro was a member of the organization for some time.

== Founding ==
The Popular Socialist Youth was founded on November 18, 1944. The organization was founded as a continuation of the Young Communist League and the Cuban Revolutionary Youth (JRC).

== Organization ==
The Popular Socialist Youth was open to membership for persons between 15 and 35 years of age, who had the approval of two members of the party or the youth organization.

== Mella ==
The organization began publishing the forthnightly Mella in 1944. In 1955, during the Fulgencio Batista regime, Mella was converted into a clandestine monthly publication. As of 1960, Mella was a forthnightly newspaper had a circulation of 30,000. The symbol of the organization carried a portrait of Julio Antonio Mella with a red star as background.

== Campaigns ==
The Popular Socialist Youth played a major role in campaigning against the proposal to send 2,000 Cuban troops to participate on the American side in the Korean War.

The Popular Socialist Youth formed part of the Independent Youth Bloc (BJI, later renamed the Opposition Youth Bloc) together with the Orthodox and Authentic youth organizations.

== Sixth congress ==
The Popular Socialist Youth held its sixth congress on April 6, 1960. At the congress, held in the aftermath of the La Coubre explosion, a poster with the slogan Patria o Muerte ('Fatherland or Death') was displayed. This was the first expression of the slogan, voiced by Fidel Castro at a March 4, 1960, funeral of victims of the bombing, in print.

== Merger into UJC ==
In 1962 the organization merged with the Rebel Youth Association (AJR, the youth wing of the July 26 Movement), forming the Young Communist League (UJC). The symbol of UJC was based on that of the Popular Socialist Youth, but with Camilo Cienfuegos (and in 1967, Che Guevara) added.
