= 1940 Cuban general election =

- 14 July 1940
- Presidential election

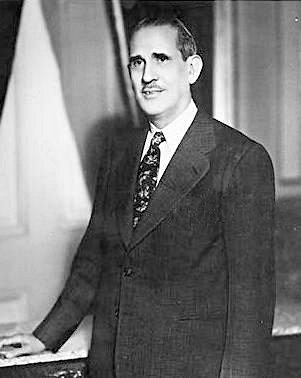
Nominee	Fulgencio Batista	Ramón Grau
Party	Independent	Auténtico
Alliance	CSD	Opposition Front
Popular vote	805,125	573,576
President before election
Federico Laredo Brú
Republican Action
Elected President
Fulgencio Batista
Independent

General elections were held in Cuba on 14 July 1940. Fulgencio Batista won the presidential election running under the People's Socialist Coalition banner. Although the Partido Auténtico emerged as the largest single party in the House of Representatives, Bastista's electoral alliance, the Democratic Socialist Coalition, won a majority of seats. Voter turnout was 73%.

== Results ==
=== President ===
Candidate	Party	Votes	%
Fulgencio Batista	Democratic Socialist Coalition (Note: Alliance of the Communist Revolutionary Union, Progressive Action, the Democratic National Association, the Liberal Party and the Republican Democratic Party)	805,125	
Ramón Grau	Opposition Front (Note: Alliance of ABC, the Partido Auténtico and Republican Action)	573,576	
Reynaldo Márquez	National Agrarian Party		
Total			
Total votes		1,421,563	–
Registered voters/turnout		1,936,212	73.42
Source: Nohlen

=== Senate ===
Party or alliance		Seats
Democratic Socialist Coalition	Republican Democratic Party	10
Democratic Socialist Coalition	Liberal Party of Cuba	5
Democratic Socialist Coalition	Nationalist Union	5
Democratic Socialist Coalition	Democratic National Association	2
Democratic Socialist Coalition	Cuban Popular Party	0
Democratic Socialist Coalition	Communist Revolutionary Union	0
Opposition Front	Partido Auténtico	8
Opposition Front	ABC	3
Opposition Front	Republican Action	3
Total		36
Source: Nohlen

=== House of Representatives ===
Party or alliance		Seats
Democratic Socialist Coalition	Liberal Party of Cuba	23
Democratic Socialist Coalition	Republican Democratic Party	22
Democratic Socialist Coalition	Nationalist Union	21
Democratic Socialist Coalition	Democratic National Association	18
Democratic Socialist Coalition	Communist Revolutionary Union	10
Opposition Front	Partido Auténtico	34
Opposition Front	Republican Action	16
Opposition Front	ABC	12
Total		156
Source: Nohlen
