= 1952 Cuban coup d'état =

1952 military coup led by Fulgencio Batista

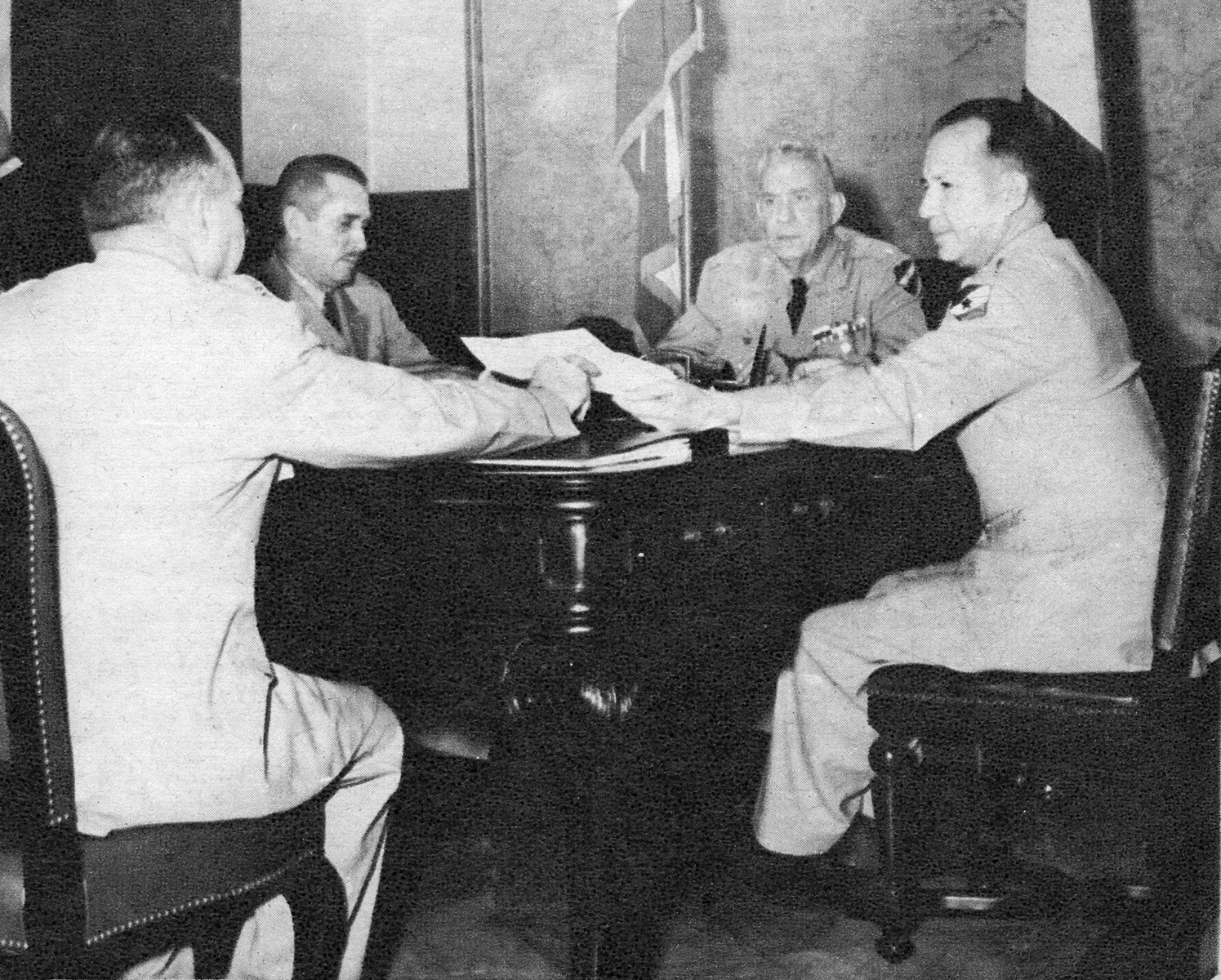
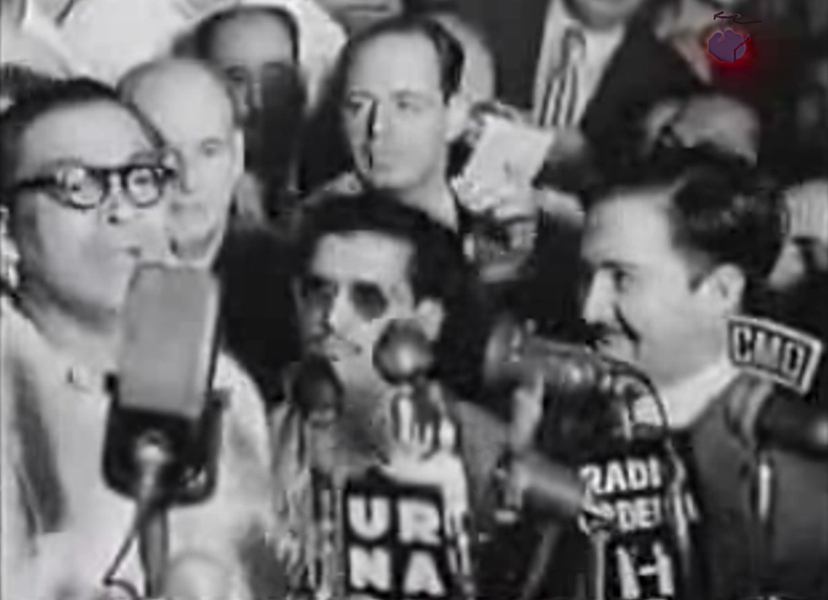
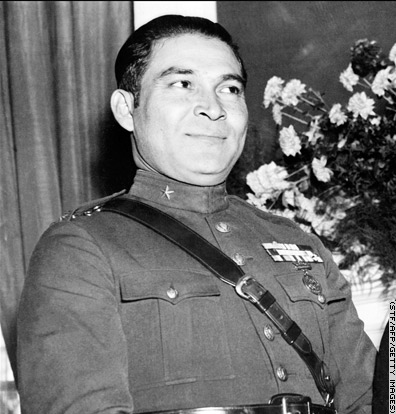
- At Camp Columbia on March 10, 1952. Four of the coup leaders. From left to right: Luis Robaina Piedra, Martín Díaz Tamayo, Francisco Tabernilla Dolz, and Eulogio Cantillo. Batista on a press conference at the same day. Batista in 1952.
Date	March 10, 1952
Location	Cuba
Result	Military victory: Cuba's government overthrown; Cuban elections ended; Military junta assumes power

Belligerents
Cuban government	Cuban Constitutional Army

Commanders and leaders
Carlos Prío Socarrás	Fulgencio Batista; Luis Robaina Piedra; Martín Díaz Tamayo; Francisco Tabernilla Dolz; Eulogio Cantillo

The 1952 Cuban coup d'état took place in Cuba on March 10, 1952, when the Cuban Constitutional Army, led by Fulgencio Batista, intervened in the election that was scheduled to be held on 1 June 1952, staging a coup d'état and establishing a de facto military dictatorship in the country. The coup has been referred to as the Batistazo in Cuban political jargon.

== Background ==
In 1940 a new democratic constitution had been ratified in Cuba. In order to engage in the elections following the constitution's ratification, Fulgencio Batista resigned from the military to focus on a career in politics. He ran for president with support from the Communist Revolutionary Union party, under the front banner of the Democratic Socialist Coalition. Batista won the election that year and served a four-year tenure. After his tenure the constitution prohibited presidents from running for consecutive terms, so he had a proxy candidate Carlos Saladrigas Zayas run as his substitute. Saladrigas would be defeated in a landslide. After the electoral defeat Batista would leave Cuba for the United States, but remained head of the Cuban army.

As the presidency of Carlos Prío Socarrás came to a close, Batista believed he could win in the following 1952 election. He was legally allowed to run again since he had not served a term since 1944. Batista (a Senator at the time) ran under the label of his own United Action Party and believed his previous popularity would guarantee him victory. An opinion poll before the election predicted Batista coming in dead last in the election. Concerned about losing the 1952 presidential election Batista began to plot a coup with retired military officials and active troops.

== Events ==
On March 10 all military garrisons came under rebel military command without resistance. The rebel officers occupied the University of Havana and opposition newspaper offices. Labor leaders were arrested and a communication black out ensued. A military junta formed in Camp Columbia with Fulgencio Batista as its head and declared itself the new government of Cuba.

== Aftermath ==
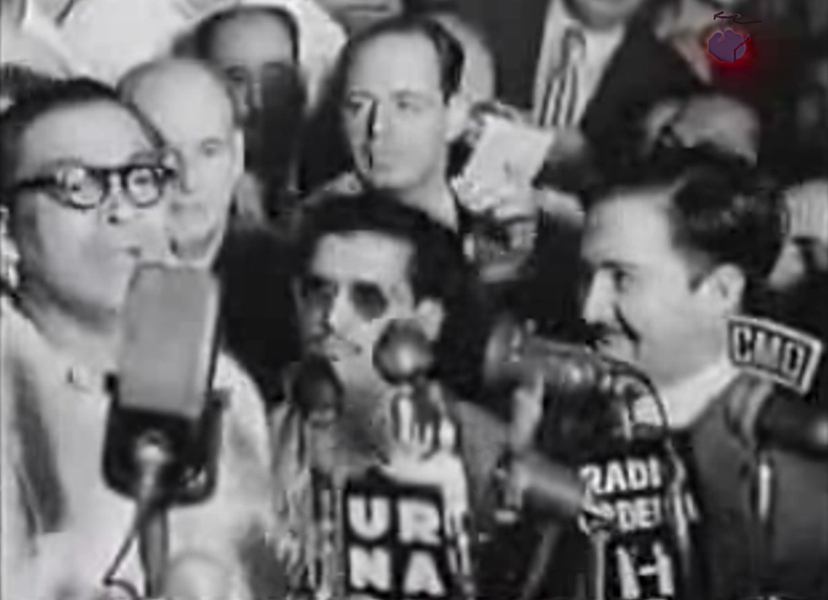
Press conference in Camp Columbia, Havana after the 1952 Cuban coup

Just two weeks after the coup, the United States recognized his government on March 27. A smiling picture of Batista with the Cuban flag behind him appeared on the cover of Time magazine, with the headline "Cuba's Batista: He Got Past Democracy’s Sentries".

Cuban Choteo humor became more popular after the coup due to political pessimism in the country. Choteo humor mocked the political establishment and took a self-satirizing approach to portraying the "lack" of capabilities of the Cuban people. Martíanismo also became the popular ideology of most of the Cuban political opposition. Before then the ideas of José Martí were less important compared to his image as an authentic Cuban founding father whose invocation gave legitimacy to opposition organizations. After the 1952 coup the ideas and image of Martí had become so popular within the opposition that Martíano language was the common expression of opposition politics.

Batista (whose rule was formalized after the 1954 general election) went on to rule the country until January 1, 1959, when he was forced into exile with his family (first to the Trujillo–ruled Dominican Republic, then Corporatist Portugal and eventually Francoist Spain). Batista's exile marked the climax of the Cuban Revolution, which started on July 26, 1953, with the attack on the Moncada Barracks in Santiago de Cuba, and saw Fidel Castro emerging as the new leader of Cuba.

== See also ==
- History of Cuba
- Timeline of Cuban history
