= Alfredo Duran =

American lawyer (born 1936)

Alfredo Joaquin González Durán (born 16 August 1936) is a Cuban-born lawyer and an advocate for dialogue as a way to bring regime change in Cuba. His views are considered controversial in some parts of the Cuban exile community in Miami.

== Early life ==
Duran was born in Havana in 1936, the son of Ana Durán. In 1941, Duran's mother married Anselmo Alliegro y Milá, a Cuban senator and government minister. It was Alliegro, then president of the Senate, who accepted Fulgencio Batista's resignation on Dec. 31, 1958, and then took refuge, with his family, in the Chilean Embassy in Havana for three months. After spending two additional months in Chile itself, the family permanently arrived in Miami.

Duran had first come to the United States to study at Valley Forge Military Academy and Louisiana State University. He was graduated from LSU with a bachelor's in science degree in 1957.

== Political career ==
=== Bay of Pigs Invasion and exile ===
A refugee in Miami since September, 1959, Duran was a member of Brigade 2506 (Brigada Asalto 2506), a group of Cuban exiles trained by the CIA in preparation for the 1961 Bay of Pigs Invasion of Cuba and the planned overthrow of its prime minister, Fidel Castro. Duran was captured during the conflict, and spent 18 months in prison in Cuba, before being ransomed by U.S. organizations and businesses.

After his release in December 1962, Duran remained active in anti-Castro circles and joined the Veteran's Association of Brigade 2506, serving as president two years in a row. He received his law degree from the University of Miami in 1967. Duran has two sons, Alfredo R. and Alfredo J., from his first marriage. He married his second wife, María Elena Prío Tarrero, the daughter of former Cuban President Carlos Prío Socarrás on Feb. 19, 1972. An item in a Miami News news social column characterized the wedding as "the union of two of Cuba's most powerful political families." The couple has since divorced.

In 1973, Duran became the first Hispanic American to serve on the Dade County School Board when he was appointed by Reubin Askew, Governor of Florida. He also served on the Dade Community Relations Board and the Urban League. Duran has long been active in Democratic Party politics, including serving on the National Democratic Committee. Duran was chairman of the Florida Democratic Party from 1976 to 1980.

=== Political turnaround ===
During the late 1980s, Duran began to have private misgivings about the advisability of a military solution to obtaining regime change in Cuba. Duran did not go public with his doubts until the early 1990s, after the fall of Soviet Union. Duran's former comrades were outraged that a former president of the Veteran's Association of Brigade 2506 was advocating peaceful dialogue with the communist government of Cuba. Duran told Frontline: "To the right wing or more conservative community here in Miami, a dialogado is the worst thing that you could be called. It implies that you're a traitor." The Veteran's Association of Brigade 2506 expelled Duran in a public rebuke in 1993.

Following the expulsion, Duran founded the Cuban Committee for Democracy, that seeks to bring democracy to Cuba through dialogue and peaceful means.

In March 2001, Duran made a visit to the site of the Bay of Pigs Invasion, accompanied by Arthur Schlesinger Jr., Richard N. Goodwin, Wayne S. Smith, Jean Kennedy Smith (sister of John F. Kennedy), and others. The 60-member American delegation was taking part in a conference in Havana, titled Bay of Pigs: 40 Years After, marking the 40th anniversary of the Bay of Pigs Invasion. The conference was organized by the University of Havana and the National Security Archives, a nonprofit group based in Washington, D.C., that strives to declassify government documents on U.S. foreign policy decisions. During that 2001 visit to Cuba, Duran met with José Ramón Fernández, who is now a vice president of the Cuban Council of Ministers but who, in April 1961, was the executive commander (directly reporting to Fidel Castro) in charge of Cuba's defending forces during the Bay of Pigs Invasion. Duran called that encounter "very emotional."

Duran has publicly called for an end to all travel restrictions to Cuba. As he said on PBS NewsHour:

We must absolutely lift all restrictions for Americans to travel to Cuba. It's a constitutional right of all Americans to be—it must be protected under the laws of this country. And I think that if Cuban-Americans are allowed to go, Americans should be allowed to go.

And I think that's going to have a tremendous impact, because the travel of Americans is not like the travel of Europeans or Canadians. Cubans play baseball; they don't play hockey. And our cultural nearness is very similar.

You go to Cuba right now, and it's like the Russians had never gone by there. You go to Cuba right now, and you still can feel the influence of our American tradition in the past and our cultural nearness.
