= Ramón Zaydín =

2nd Prime Minister of Cuba

His Excellency Ramón Zaydín
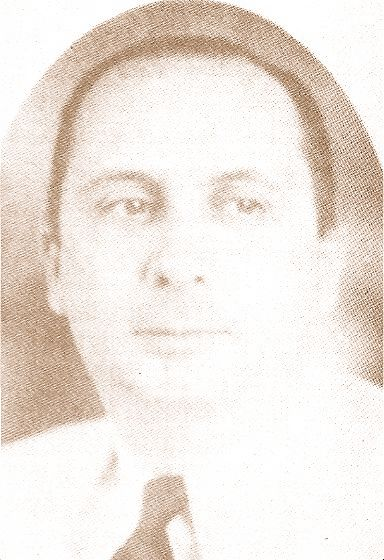

2nd Prime Minister of Cuba
- In office 16 August 1942 – 16 March 1944
- President: Fulgencio Batista
- Preceded by: Carlos Saladrigas
- Succeeded by: Anselmo Alliegro

Personal details
- Born: 1895 Havana, Cuba
- Died: July 23, 1968 (aged 72–73) Madrid, Spain
- Party: Liberal Party of Cuba
- Spouse: Maria Antonia Diago
- Education: University of Havana
- Profession: Lawyer, politician

Ramón Zaydín y Márquez-Sterling (1895–1968) was a Cuban politician and Prime Minister of Cuba.

He was an Abogado-notario. He served in the House of Representatives, and was elected as its president from April 1925 to April 1927. He was delegate to the Constitutional Convention of 1940, a Senator, Prime Minister of Cuba (1942-1944), and vice-presidential candidate in the elections of 1944. He was also a professor at the University of Havana School of Law. He was married to Maria Antonia Diago.

Political offices
Preceded by Carlos Saladrigas	Prime Minister of Cuba; 16 August 1942 – 16 March 1944	Succeeded by Anselmo Alliegro
