= Raúl López del Castillo =

Cuban lawyer and government official

Raúl López del Castillo (1893 in Cuba – 24 July 1963 in Miami, Florida, USA) was a Cuban lawyer and government official.

Lopez was the Prime Minister of Cuba from May 1, 1947 to October 10, 1948 during the presidency of Ramon Grau. Previously he served as Under-Secretary of the Treasury (1944–1946). He was a member of the Cuban Revolutionary Party (Partido Auténtico).

He wrote several law books in both English and Spanish. He was married to Sofia de la Hoya. They had two children: Sophie and Raul Jr.

Political offices
Preceded by Carlos Prío Socarrás	Prime Minister of Cuba; 1946 - 1948	Succeeded by Manuel Antonio de Varona y Loredo
