= Anselmo Alliegro y Milá =

Cuban politician and prime minister of Cuba (1899–1961)

His Excellency Anselmo Alliegro
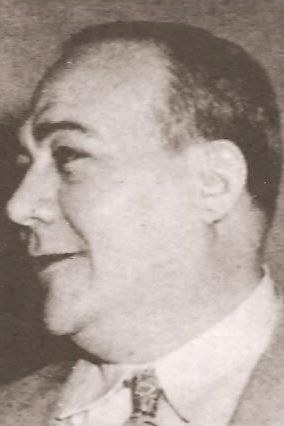

3rd Prime Minister of Cuba
- In office 16 March 1944 – 10 October 1944
- President: Fulgencio Batista
- Preceded by: Carlos Saladrigas
- Succeeded by: Félix Lancís Sánchez

President of the Senate of Cuba
- In office 28 January 1955 – 5 January 1959
- Preceded by: Manuel Antonio de Varona
- Succeeded by: Position abolished

Personal details
- Born: March 16, 1899 Baracoa, Cuba
- Died: November 22, 1961 (aged 62) Miami, Florida, U.S.
- Party: Liberal Party of Cuba (1940–1949); United Action Party (1949–1952); Progressive Action Party (1952–1959)
- Spouse(s): Ana Durán (Cuba, 1916 - Miami, 2007)
- Children: Anselmo Jr. Rosa Maria; Alfredo González Durán (stepson)
- Education: University of Havana
- Profession: Lawyer, politician

Anselmo Alliegro y Milá (March 16, 1899 – November 22, 1961) was a Cuban politician who served as Prime minister of Cuba.

He was president of the Senate in the Congress of Cuba from 28 January 1955 to 1 January 1959, and served as Prime Minister of Cuba in 1944. He was also Mayor of the town of Baracoa, Representative in the Cuban Congress of 1925, 1940, 1945; Minister of Commerce 1942, Minister of Education, and Minister of Finance.

On January 1, 1959, a military junta offered him the interim presidency of Cuba to replace Fulgencio Batista, who resigned and emigrated that day, but he did not accept it and emigrated with his family to Chile three months later, where they lived for two months and moved to Miami, United States.

Alliegro was the son of an Italian, Miguel Alliegro Esculpino and a Spaniard, Donatila Milá. He was married to Ana Durán with whom he had one child, Anselmo Leon Alliegro Jr. He also had a daughter, Rosa Maria "Polita" Alliegro y Sanchez, from his previous marriage to Rosa M. Sanchez and a step-son, Alfredo G. Duran, a product of his wife Anita Duran's first marriage.
