= Young Communist League (Cuba, 1928) =

LJC symbol

The Young Communist League (Spanish: Liga Juvenil Comunista) was the youth wing of the Communist Party of Cuba. The LJC was founded in 1928. As of 1933, LJC was estimated to have around 5,000 members.

== See also ==
- Young Communist League (Cuba) Current Cuban YCL
