= Democratic Socialist Coalition =

Democratic Socialist Coalition Coalición Socialista Democrática
- Leader: Fulgencio Batista
- Founded: 1939
- Dissolved: 1944
- Headquarters: La Havana
- Ideology: Populism; Liberalism; Conservatism; Communism; During Fulgencio Batista's first presidency term: Corporatism; Statism; Keynesianism; Economic interventionism Capitalism; Progressive reformism
- Political position: Big tent

The Democratic Socialist Coalition (Spanish: Coalición Socialista Democrática, CSD) was a Cuban political coalition, led by Fulgencio Batista.

== History ==
This political coalition was founded in 1939, and served for the 1940 general elections, won by Batista. The founding parties and members were five: the Liberal Party (liberal), the Nationalist Union Party (conservative), the Communist Revolutionary Union (communist), the Democratic National Association (conservative), and Republican Democratic Party.

The Coalition won 36 of 162 Deputies, against the 45 of Opposition Front. In the 1944 election, the coalition supported the presidential candidacy of Carlos Saladrigas Zayas as President and Ramón Zaydín as Vice President, but it was made up of these parties in 1944: Liberal Party of Cuba, Popular Socialist Party, Democratic Party, and ABC. However, the election was won by Ramón Grau San Martín.
