= Andrés Domingo y Morales del Castillo =

Cuban politician (1892–1979)

Andrés Domingo
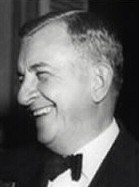
- Domingo in 1968

Acting President of Cuba
- In office 14 August 1954 – 24 February 1955
- Preceded by: Fulgencio Batista (acting)
- Succeeded by: Fulgencio Batista

Personal details
- Born: Andrés Domingo y Morales del Castillo; September 4, 1892 Santiago de Cuba, Captaincy General of Cuba
- Died: June 1, 1979 (aged 86) Miami, Florida, U.S.
- Education: University of Havana
- Profession: Jurist

Dr. Andrés Domingo y Morales del Castillo (Latin American Spanish: [anˈdres ðoˈmiŋɡo i moˈɾales ðel kasˈtiʝo]; September 4, 1892 – June 1, 1979) was a Cuban jurist and politician who served as interim President of Cuba.

He was the son of Andrés Domingo y Romero and Antonia Morales del Castillo y Durive. He graduated from the University of Havana School of Law. He served as Judge and later Senator in 1944 and 1948.

Domingo served as Minister of Presidency, Justice, Housing, Defense and Foreign Minister during Fulgencio Batista’s terms as president. On August 14, 1954, Batista made Domingo President of Cuba so that he could run for president. Once Batista was sworn in as president on February 24, 1955, Domingo resumed his ministerial positions.
