= Félix Lancís Sánchez =

Cuban politician

Félix Lancís
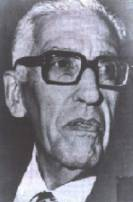
- 1975
- Born: November 20, 1900; Havana, Cuba
- Died: 1976; Cuba

Félix Lancís Sánchez (November 20, 1900 – 1976) was a Cuban politician, physician and Prime Minister of Cuba.

He was a lawyer, who served as Senator, Minister of Education and was twice Prime Minister of Cuba (1944–1945 and 1950–1951). He was married to Carmelina Barba. He died in Havana, Cuba, aged 75.

Political offices
Preceded by Anselmo Alliegro	Prime Minister of Cuba; 10 October 1944 – 13 October 1945	Succeeded by Carlos Prío
Preceded by Manuel Antonio de Varona	Prime Minister of Cuba; 6 October 1950 – 1 October 1951	Succeeded by Óscar Gans
