= Manuel Antonio de Varona =

Cuban lawyer and politician

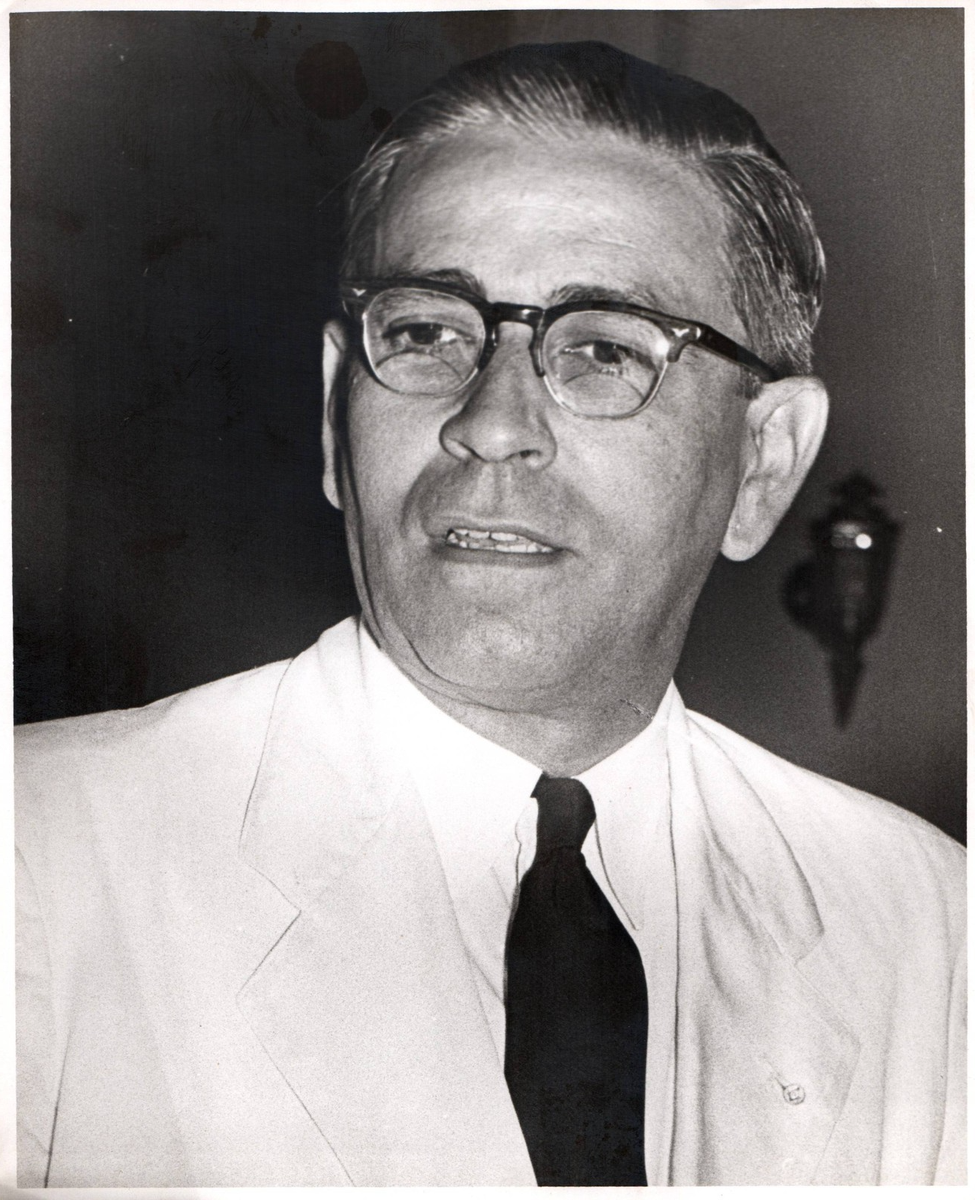
- Varona in 1954

President of the Senate of Cuba
- In office 6 October 1950 – 10 March 1952
- Preceded by: Miguel A. Suárez Fernández
- Succeeded by: Anselmo Alliegro y Milá

Personal details
- Born: November 25, 1908 Cuba
- Died: October 29, 1992 (aged 83) Miami, Florida, U.S.

Manuel Antonio de Varona y Loredo (November 25, 1908 – October 29, 1992) was a Cuban lawyer and politician.

== Biography ==
=== Political career ===
Varona is 7th Prime Minister of Cuba in 1948–1950, and served as president of the Cuban Senate from 1950 to 1952. In 1960, Varona went into exile after denouncing Castro's communist regime. He was a member of the exile coalition Cuban Revolutionary Council (1961–1964).

He had three children: Carlos de Varona Segura who participated in the April 17th Bay of Pigs Invasion, Emelina Ivette, and Ivonne de Varona Ruisanchez.

He wrote El drama de Cuba ante América (1960, Mexico City, Centro de Información Democrática de América).

He is buried at Flagler Memorial Park in Miami, Florida.

== Castro and the CIA ==
During Varona's exile in Miami, the CIA supported his operational planning for the Bay of Pigs Invasion. They provided pills laced with botulinum toxin to effect the assassination of Fidel Castro. The pills were never used, because Castro had stopped visiting the restaurant where an anti-Castro worker intended to use them.

A transcript declassified in 2021 of a 1975 Church Committee hearing detailed the covert CIA operation to assassinate Castro:

Mr. Breckinridge: Just before the first phase ended, Roselli, through Trafficante, was introduced to another Cuban exile leader in Miami by the name of Anthony Varona. Again, his name is a sensitive matter.

Varona was the leader of one of the groups that was being supported by the CIA as part of the preparation for the Bay of Pigs.

Varona was unhappy with his association, with the association with the CIA. He felt he had not been given enough money. Varona was approached by Roselli with Trafficante's introduction to take on this mission

Roselli's story was that he represented some private client who had interest in Cuba. The Roselli identity was apparent, as was Trafficante's.

Varona said he knew someone who was in a restaurant that Castro frequented and then the pills were transported again.

Mr. Schwartz. Could you state for the record who made the pills?

Mr. Breckinridge. The pills were made in what was then the Technical Services Division of the CIA.

Mr. Schwartz. Had they ever made such pills before?

Mr. Breckinridge. Not that I know of.

Mr. Schwartz. Had they ever used Botulinum as a poison in any way before?

Mr, Breckinridge. On one previous occasion Botulinum had been considered for use on cigars that someone had hoped to get to Castro, and eventually that never got off the ground. This was a scheme that was never approved and never went forward. I know of one instance in which it was considered.

Botulinum was made into pills and these pills were taken again to Cuba. Castro stopped going to the restaurant where this man was. The Bay of Pigs occurred and the operation was called off.

A second poison plot against Castro occurred after the failure of the Bay of Pigs invasion. In April 1962 Johnny Roselli was contacted by William King Harvey of the CIA who wanted to revive the idea of poisoning Castro. However, just like the first poison plot, this one also did not get far. Roselli suggested giving poison pills to Tony Varona who would forward the pills to a chef in a restaurant frequented by Castro. This suggestion was adopted although the chef placed the pills in the freezer, making them unusable.

In August 1960 the mobster Meyer Lansky struck a deal in Miami with Varona. Varona would form a government-in-exile bankrolled by Lansky who would also help with the publicity side of things. Lansky promised millions of dollars in support in return for a re-opening of the hotels and casinos in a post-Castro Cuba. However the deal fell through. In July 1963 he met with leaders of the Chicago outfit, including boss Sam Giancana and Murray Humphreys. One CIA confidential informant reported that four mafia figures made a donation of $200,000 to Varona.

Political offices
Preceded by Raúl López del Castillo	Prime Minister of Cuba; 10 October 1948 – 6 October 1950	Succeeded by Félix Lancís
