= Carlos Saladrigas Zayas =

Cuban politician and diplomat

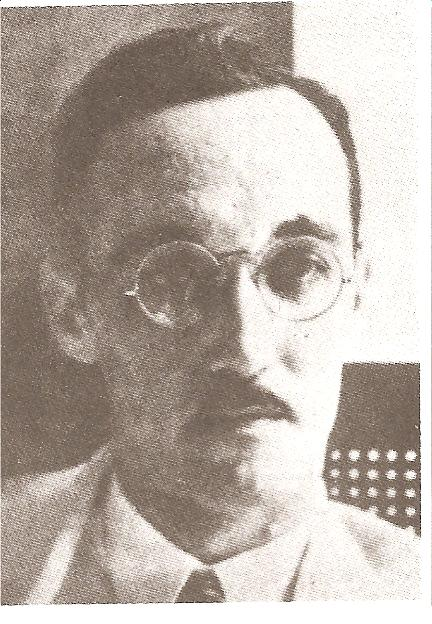

1st Prime Minister of Cuba
- In office 10 October 1940 – 16 August 1942
- President: Fulgencio Batista
- Preceded by: Position Established
- Succeeded by: Ramón Zaydín

Personal details
- Born: 13 October 1900 Havana, Cuba
- Died: 15 April 1956 (aged 55) Havana, Cuba
- Party: Popular Socialist Party
- Spouse(s): María González-Llorente; Esperanza Plasencia; Cusa Carrillo
- Children: 2
- Profession: Lawyer

Carlos Saladrigas Zayas (Carlos Eduardo Ramón Saladrigas y Zayas; October 13, 1900 – 15 April 1956) was a Cuban politician and diplomat.

== Career ==
He was an abogado-notario who served as Senator (1936-1940), Minister of Justice (1934), Foreign Minister (1933) and (1955-1956), Prime Minister of Cuba (1940-1942), Ambassador to Great Britain, and presidential candidate in the elections of 1944.

During the government of Carlos Manuel de Céspedes, he was appointed Minister of Justice where he actively conspired against the One Hundred Days Government during his term. During the presidency of Carlos Mendieta, he held several government positions and in 1936, he was elected senator from the National Democratic Coalition.

Linked to Fulgencio Batista since the 1930s, he became Prime Minister in Batista's constitutional government. He was the presidential candidate for the Democratic Socialist Coalition in the 1944 presidential elections, in which he was defeated by Ramón Grau San Martín. Loyal to Batista, he supported him after the coup d'état of 1952 and was subsequently appointed Minister of Labor.

== Personal life ==
He was the son of Enrique Saladrigas Lunar and María Luisa Zayas y Diago. He married his wife, María de las Mercedes González-Llorente y Martínez in 1923 and they had two children, Gloria and Carlos Saladrigas y González-Llorente. He later married Esperanza Plasencia y del Peso and lastly Cusa Carrillo.

Political offices
Preceded by Office established	Prime Minister of Cuba; 10 October 1940 – 16 August 1942	Succeeded by Ramón Zaydín
Preceded by ?	Foreign Minister of Cuba; 1933	Succeeded by Manuel Márquez Sterling
Preceded by Andrés Domingo	Foreign Minister of Cuba; 1955-1956	Succeeded by Gonzalo Güell
