= 1928 Cuban presidential election =

- 1 November 1928
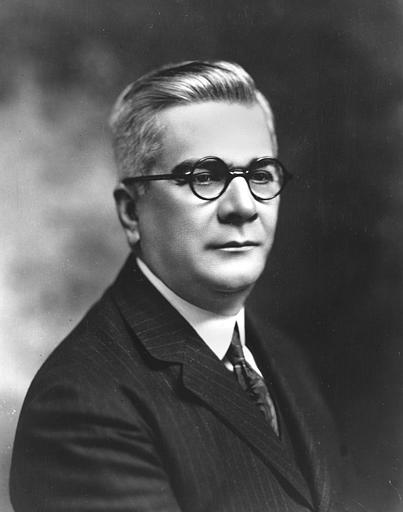
Nominee	Gerardo Machado
Party	Liberal
President before election
Gerardo Machado
Liberal
Elected President
Gerardo Machado
Liberal

Presidential elections were held in Cuba on 1 November 1928. The non-democratic elections were won by incumbent President Gerardo Machado who was the only candidate. Despite promising to govern only for one term, Machado ran for re-election in 1928. The opposition was repressed.
