= Carlos Prío Socarrás =

President of Cuba from 1948 to 1952

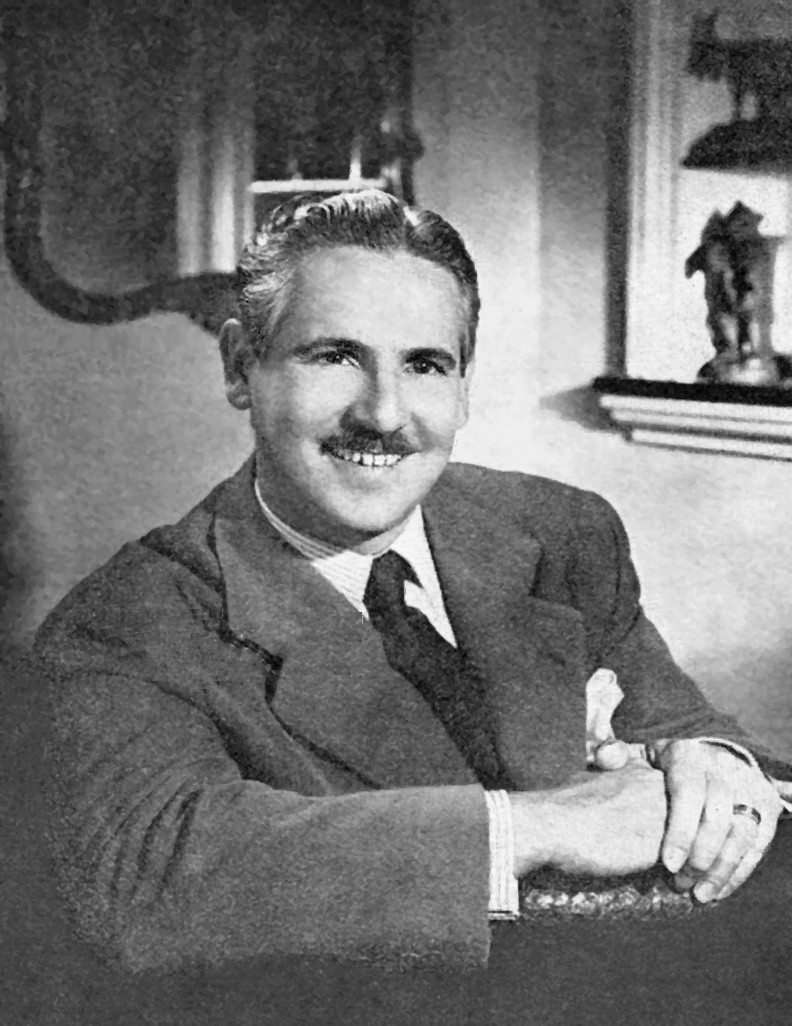

11th President of Cuba
- In office October 10, 1948 – March 10, 1952
- Prime Minister: Manuel Antonio de Varona; Félix Lancís Sánchez; Oscar Gans; Antonio Sánchez de Bustamante
- Vice President: Guillermo Alonso Pujol
- Preceded by: Ramón Grau
- Succeeded by: Fulgencio Batista

5th Prime Minister of Cuba
- In office October 13, 1945 – May 1, 1947
- Preceded by: Félix Lancís Sánchez
- Succeeded by: Raúl López del Castillo

Personal details
- Born: July 14, 1903 Bahía Honda, Cuba
- Died: April 5, 1977 (aged 73) Miami Beach, Florida, U.S.
- Cause of death: Suicide by gunshot
- Party: Cuban Revolutionary Party (Authentic)
- Spouse(s): Gina Karell Mary Tarrero-Serrano (m. 1945)
- Relations: Antonio Prío (brother); Francisco Prío (brother); Maria Regla Prío (sister)
- Children: 5, including Carlos Prio-Touzet
- Education: Colegio de Belen; University of Havana
- Profession: Attorney, politician

Carlos Manuel Prío Socarrás (Spanish: [ˈkaɾlos maˈnwel ˈpɾi.o sokaˈras]; July 14, 1903 – April 5, 1977) was a Cuban politician. He served as the President of Cuba from 1948 until he was deposed by a military coup led by Fulgencio Batista on March 10, 1952, three months before new elections were to be held. He was the first president of Cuba to be born in an independent Cuba and the last to gain his post through universal, contested elections. He went into exile in the United States, where he lived for 25 years before dying by suicide at age 73.

== Governance ==
In 1940, Prío was elected senator of Pinar del Río Province. Four years later, fellow Partido Auténtico member Ramón Grau became president, and during the Grau administration Prío served turns as Minister of Public Works, Minister of Labor and Prime Minister. On July 1, 1948, he was elected president of Cuba as a member of the Partido Auténtico. Prío was assisted by Chief of the Armed Forces General Genovevo Pérez Dámera and Colonel José Luis Chinea Cárdenas, who had previously been in charge of the Province of Santa Clara.

The eight years under Grau and Prío, were, according to Charles Ameringer,

[...] unique in Cuban history. They were a time of constitutional order and political freedom. They were not 'golden years' by any means, but in two elections (1944 and 1948), Cubans had the opportunity to express their desire for a rule of civil liberties, primacy of Cuban culture, and achievement of economic independence. If there were sharp contradictions in Cuban society under the Auténticos, the circumstances differed only in degree from the complexities and dynamics encountered in free societies everywhere (how often did Cubans compare Havana with Chicago?).

Prío, called el presidente cordial ("the cordial president"), was committed to a rule marked by civility, primarily in its respect for freedom of expression. Several public-works projects and the establishment of a National Bank and Tribunal of Accounts count among his successes.

However, violence among political factions and reports of theft and self-enrichment in the government ranks marred Prío's term. The Prío administration increasingly came to be perceived by the public as ineffectual in the face of violence and corruption, much as the Grau administration before it.

With elections scheduled for the middle of 1952, rumors surfaced of a planned military coup by long-shot presidential contender Fulgencio Batista. Prío, seeing no constitutional basis to act, did not do so. The rumors proved to be true. On March 10, 1952, Batista and his collaborators seized military and police commands throughout the country and occupied major radio and TV stations. Batista assumed power when Prío, failing to mount a resistance, boarded a plane and went into exile.

According to Arthur M. Schlesinger Jr., Prío later said of his presidency:

They say that I was a terrible president of Cuba. That may be true. But I was the best president Cuba ever had.

In 1953 he appeared in court over violations of the Neutrality Act, specifically "conspiracy to export arms and implements of war from the United States without license". He pled not guilty.

In 1977, several weeks before his death, he travelled to Washington, DC with other Miami Cubans to express their opposition over any detente with Cuba to the Secretary of State Cyrus Vance.

== Personal life and death ==
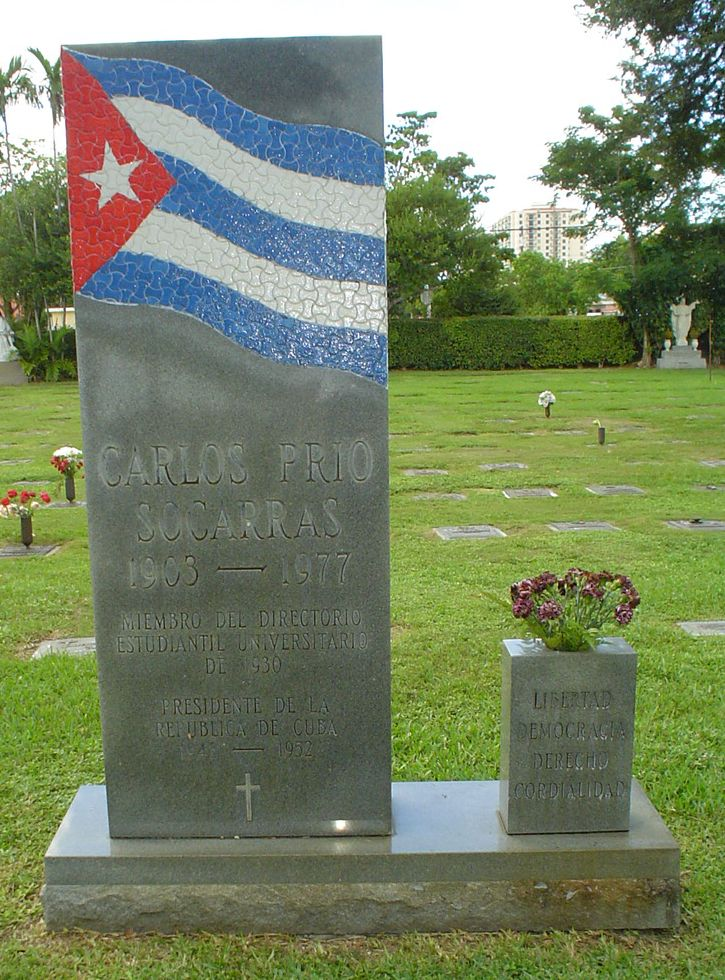
Carlos Prío's grave

Prio first married Inés Georgina (Gina) Karell Pedrosa and they had one daughter, Rocío Guadalupe Prío-Karell. He married María Dolores "Mary" Tarrero-Serrano (1924–2010) on June 17, 1945, in the Chapel of the Presidential Palace, and they had two daughters, María Antonetta Prío-Tarrero (married to César Odio, former City Manager of the City of Miami) and María Elena Prío-Tarrero (divorced from Alfredo Duran, former chairman of the Florida Democratic Party). He also had two recognized children with his former mistress, Celia Rosa Touzet Masfera: Carlos Prio-Touzet, an architect, and Rodolfo (Rudy) Prío-Touzet.

Prío died by suicide by gunshot to the chest on April 5, 1977, in Miami Beach, Florida, at age 73. He was found in his garage and rushed to Mount Sinai Hospital where he later died on the operating table. He was scheduled to be interviewed by Gaeton Fonzi of the House Select Committee on Assassinations a week from when he committed suicide. He and his wife Mary are buried at Woodlawn Park Cemetery and Mausoleum (now Caballero Rivero Woodlawn North Park Cemetery and Mausoleum) in Miami, Florida.

Political offices
Preceded by Ramón Grau	President of Cuba; 1948–1952	Succeeded by Fulgencio Batista
Preceded by Félix Lancís	Prime Minister of Cuba; 13 October 1945 – 1 May 1947	Succeeded by Raúl López del Castillo
