= Eduardo Chibás =

Cuban politician (1907–1951)

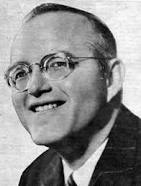
Eduardo Chibás

Eduardo René Chibás Ribas (August 26, 1907 – August 16, 1951) was a Cuban politician who used radio to broadcast his political views to the public. He primarily denounced corruption and gangsterism rampant during the governments of Ramón Grau and Carlos Prío which preceded the Batista era. He believed corruption was the most important problem Cuba faced.

Born in Santiago de Cuba to Eduardo Justo Chibás Guerra and Gloria Ribas-Rocafull y Agramonte, Chibás' strong nationalism is considered to be an inspiration for the Cuban Revolution.

In 1947 he formed the Orthodox Party, a strongly anti-imperialist group, which had the goal of exposing government corruption and bringing about revolutionary change through constitutional means. Chibás lost the 1948 election for president, finishing in third place. He was an extremely strong critic of that election's winner, Carlos Prío Socarrás. He was considered a favorite in the 1952 presidential election, but committed suicide a year before Fulgencio Batista seized control of the Cuban government.

== Politics ==
=== Early political career ===
Chíbas' political forays started at the University of Havana. After a trip to Europe in 1925, during which he met several other prominent activists, including Ramón Grau, Chíbas became involved in anti-Machado radical protest groups. In 1927, he helped found the Student Directorate, and was briefly jailed in 1931. Though Chibás was never formally involved in the radical ABC group, he ensured that the Directorate maintained close contact with the group, in hopes of "enhancing the organization's prestige." He moved to Washington, D.C. shortly after, where he learned the impact radio could have on individuals. However, he later denounced violence in favor of prudent politics. Chibás refused to join a political party for most of the 1930s. In 1938, though, he joined the Auténticos, supporting Grau.

=== Party involvement and radio activism ===
After the student directorate splintered following the election of Grau, and subsequent autonomy granted to the University of Havana, Chibás moved into mainstream politics. Chibás attacked the corruption he saw manifesting during the late 1940s. He criticized President Carlos Prío Socarrás for his economic policy, accusing him of compromising national sovereignty. Broadcasting to a nationwide audience every week, Chibas gave fiery speeches denouncing shady politics. By 1948, he was the leader of the Partido Ortodoxo and denounced his former friend Ramón Grau in a presidential run. Chibás took a pro-Cuba, strongly nationalistic stance throughout his campaign—dubbed a call for "revolution" by some of his contemporaries. However, he finished in third place. A few years later, though, his platform picked up steam. By 1951, Chibás ranked first among Cubans' voting preferences for the 1952 election (never held) Chibás committed suicide in 1951.

== Death ==
Later in his life, Chibás' claims of corruption against the Cuban government became increasingly reckless. In January 1951, he asserted that a public loan of 25 million pesos was an unnecessary levy that would be pocketed by the rich owners of sugar plantations. Later that year, Chibás tried to take on education minister Aureliano Sánchez Arango. He raised numerous allegations of embezzlement. He faced mounting pressure from the Cuban public when he was unable to offer definitive evidence that Sánchez Arango was corrupt. On August 5, 1951, Chibás walked into the Radiocentro CMQ Building in Havana, for his weekly radio broadcast. That day he had promised to furnish the evidence supporting his claim that Sánchez Arango was embezzling money. Instead, he talked about other topics, warned that Fulgencio Batista might attempt a military coup, and made a farewell statement. He shot himself in the stomach and groin three times shortly after his broadcast ended.

Chibás was initially expected to survive, but after eleven days of intensive care, he died in the hospital of his wounds. The whole country grieved his death. He is buried in Colón Cemetery, Havana. His funeral was attended by hundreds of thousands, and it has been speculated that he might have been a contender for the 1952 presidential elections. Batista took the government by force on March 10, 1952, less than 8 months after the death of Chibás.

== Comparisons to Fidel Castro ==
While locked in a prison cell in 1931, Chibás reportedly proclaimed: "If I am going to die, I want my last words to be for the Cuban revolution. I am a revolutionary; I love my patria and have contempt for the current regime." Five years later, he declared "If I die, it will be for the revolution" to a taxi driver rushing him to the hospital. These sorts of radical nationalist sentiments have drawn comparisons between Castro and Chibás. Castro was undoubtedly familiar with Chibás' Orthodox Party, which pushed strong revolutionary ideals. There are numerous cases of rousing rhetoric from Castro that verify those assumptions. Before his attack on the Moncada Barracks in 1953, Castro referenced Chibás, in front of a group of revolutionaries largely inspired by the outspoken leader. It was later revealed that Castro had carried a tape of Chibás' final broadcast into battle, and planned on broadcasting it over the airwaves upon victory. Castro also used some of Chibás' rhetorical technique in his well-chronicled "History will absolve me" defense in court. And finally, Castro gave a speech at Chibás' grave following his successful seizure of power:

"Today is like a culmination of the whole story, the story of the revolution and the events of 26 July, which are so closely linked with the tale of this tomb, with the memory of the man who lies here, with his ideology, feelings and preaching, because I should say here that without the preaching of Chibás, without what he did, without the civic conscience and rebellion he awakened in the Cuban young people, the events of 26 July would not have been possible."

Scholars have contrasting opinions as to how friendly the two were in life. In 1948, Castro traveled with Chibás for campaign rallies and political events, and introduced him regularly. Yet some have argued that the two disliked and mistrusted each other. However they interacted in life, Castro leveraged Chibás as a symbol in death—and an example to his revolution.

Some scholars have also pointed out that both leaders were united in their use of technological media to connect to people. Chibás utilized the power of radio to reach his supporters, speaking weekly from the Radiocentro CMQ Building in Havana. Castro would later do the same, but using the television.

The leaders clashed in terms of politics. Castro's embracement of communism directly conflicted with Chibás' outspoken disdain for such a system. Over time, Castro referenced Chibás less, and eventually cancelled the annual parade on the anniversary of his death.

== Legacy ==
Chibás' legend grew after his death. Approximately 300,000 people attended his funeral procession, and one co-founding member of the Ortodoxo party "appeared early each morning to wash the marble sepulcher, prune flowers left by devotees, and sweep the surrounding area." Fidel Castro had a statue erected of the leader in Santiago de Cuba. A nine-point document, the "Moncada Manifesto", was circulated following his death, issuing a series of steps for overthrowing the Batista government—based on Chibás' principles, and referencing him by name.

Chibás' memory continued to expand during the decade following the Cuban Revolution. Though he was a staunch anti-communist, he came to symbolize revolutionary ideals rather than democratic politics. Batista expressed fear of the lasting symbol of Chibás, writing that "the reformer and demagogue now appeared to the people as a martyr and this gave a prestige to his party." Castro leveraged that martyrdom in his 26 July Movement, often using his revolutionary rhetoric as a means of inspiring the Ortodoxos left behind with Chibás' death.

Over time, the importance of Chibás as a symbol began to wane. Some scholars have connected the downfall with Castro's embrace of communism, citing the likelihood that it would have clashed with Chibás' politics. Furthermore, some point out that the revolution found a more appropriate martyr in Che Guevara.

== See also ==
- Radiocentro CMQ Building
- López Serrano Building
- Colegio de Belén, Havana
