= ABC (Cuba) =

- Leader: Joaquín Martínez Sáenz
- Ideology: Anti-Gerardo Machado; Progressivism; Reformism; Anti-communism; Anti-fascism

Party flag

The ABC was a Cuban political organization founded in 1931 in opposition to the government of Gerardo Machado. It used a hierarchy of clandestine cells, in which each member would oversee a cell on the next level. The first cell was labeled A; the next tier B; then C, and so forth.

The ABC gained prominence quickly through dissemination of propaganda and through acts of terrorism. The group accepted the invitation of US Ambassador Sumner Welles to participate in a new government, only to be forced out of power in less than a month, becoming again an opposition group during the One Hundred Days Government.

== Founding ==
The ABC was founded in October 1931 by a group that had been meeting for a year in the office of Dr. Juan Andrés Lliteras. The most prominent member was Joaquín Martínez Sáenz. Jorge Mañach and Francisco Ichaso were soon invited to join. The group's membership was predominantly middle class, including students and professionals.

Cells had about seven members, each of whom could lead a cell on the tier below. Members of the organization knew only their leader and the cell below them. The system of alphabetical lettering of cells from tier to tier gave the organization its name.

A sequence of numbers along with the letter identified each individual member. The members of cell A were numbered A1, A2, A3, etc. They gave their number as the first digit used in the next cell; the cell led by A3 would have members B31, B32, B33, etc.

== Terrorism ==
The organization took credit for numerous terrorist attacks like assassinations and bombings. They targeted police officers and soldiers, and also made several high-profile killings, including Senate President Clemente Vázquez Bello. The ABC reportedly orchestrated a plan to kill Machado by bombing Vazquez Bello's funeral, but failed due to a last-minute change of cemetery.

In early 1932 the government created a secret police force called the Porra, which acted against the opposition with no less violence. This repression further weakened the Machado government and enhanced the ABC's standing.

The ABC maintained close contact with Cuba's radical student group, the Directorio Estudiantil Universitario. Student leader Eduardo Chibás wrote that students sometimes carried out the bombing missions, with the ABC providing funding and equipment, and also taking credit.

== Manifesto and ideology ==
ABC insignia

In 1932, the ABC issued a Program Manifesto, written predominantly by Martínez Saenz, Mañach, and Ichaso. The Manifesto called for a range of reforms, including women's suffrage, worker's rights (unions, eight-hour day, right to strike, pensions), the elimination of latifundios through taxation, and the creation of cooperatives. It also called for the creation of a Cuban National Bank.

Though wide-ranging, the ABC's program has been described as more pragmatic or realistic than those of other opposition groups at the time. The ABC was sometimes criticized (especially by the Communist Party of Cuba) as fascist, elitist, or crypto-imperialist. The British Ambassador John J. Broderick related his "surprise to hear university professors and lawyers and doctors of education and intelligence attempt to justify the nightly bombings in the capital and its surroundings, on the grounds that they serve to keep alive amongst the people a spirit of uneasiness and revolt until comprehensive plans have been prepared for a series of systematic direct attacks on the machinery of the Government."

The ABC itself declared its opposition to both communism and fascism. Its green banner contrasted notably with the gray, black, and blue colors of contemporary European right-wing groups, and its logo inspired by the Jewish star was intended to connote persecution.

== Regime changes of 1933–1934 ==
The green flag of the ABC

By early 1933 the ABC had reached its peak popularity, and its green flag was reportedly flown widely.

Apparently contrary to its stance against American interventionism, the ABC accepted a seat at the table in negotiations with American ambassador Sumner Welles, prompting the creation of a more rigidly anti-interventionist splinter group called ABC Radical. ABC's participation gave credibility to the negotiations, and by twice threatening to withdraw the organization was able to effect release of its imprisoned members, thanks to pressure by Welles on Machado. Welles wrote of the ABC in a telegram to Washington on 1 July 1933, "the representatives of that organization are both intelligent and well-disposed and I am hopeful that for some weeks at least the organization can be kept in line."

When, amidst a general strike in Havana, Welles succeeded in pressuring Machado to resign, the ABC requested four cabinet positions in the new government of Carlos Manuel de Céspedes y Quesada. It got two: Martínez Saenz as Secretary of the Treasury, and Carlos Saladrigas y Zayas as Secretary of Justice.

The Céspedes government was displaced by the Sergeants' Revolt of 4 September 1933. One of the plotters, Fulgencio Batista, was an ABC member, but had not secured the help of his comrades in the government. (Note: In the years preceding, Batista had been spying for the ABC while serving as a sergeant-stenographer.)

In November 1933 the ABC participated in an unsuccessful revolt against the One Hundred Days Government headed by Ramon Grau. Despite the chaos of the times, many groups including ABC Radical, the Communist Party, and eventually the armed forces under Batista fought on the side of the government. The rebels retreated to Atarés Castle, where they held out for a few hours then surrendered. This defeat, and the ABC's confused explanation of its motives for the revolt, dealt a permanent blow to the group's credibility.

== Decline and disbandment ==
The ABC continued as a political party but saw its influence steadily dwindle. The group took part in the Constitutional Assembly of 1940, along with other several parties of the time. It disbanded in 1952, after a new coup by Batista.

== Numismatic connection ==
In 1934 a new silver peso was introduced. Secretary of the Treasury Saenz was a member of ABC and suggested it be named after the group. Since then collectors have used that term for the coin.
