= Democratic Party (Cuba) =

Democratic Party Partido Demócrata
- Abbreviation: PD
- Leader: José Raimundo Andreu Martínez
- Founded: 1942
- Dissolved: 1962
- Split from: Conservative Party of Cuba

The Democratic Party (Spanish: Partido Demócrata) was a political party in Cuba. They won 21 out of 57 seats in the Cuban parliamentary election in 1942.
