= Prime Minister of Cuba =

Head of government

- Primer Ministro de la República de Cuba
- Coat of arms of Cuba

- Prime Minister standard

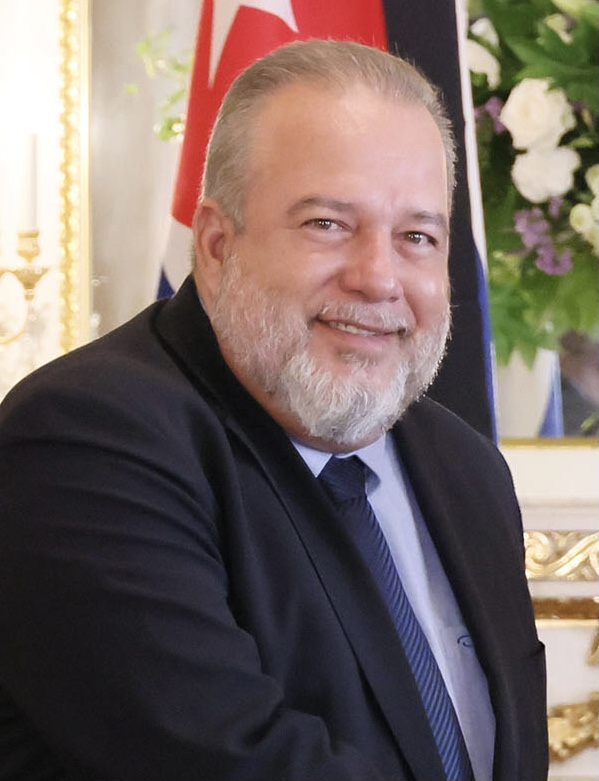
- Incumbent; Manuel Marrero Cruz since 21 December 2019
- Council of Ministers of Cuba; Government of Cuba
- Style: Mr Premier (informal)
- Type: Head of government
- Member of: Council of Ministers; Council of State
- Nominator: President of Cuba
- Appointer: National Assembly of People's Power
- Term length: 5 years
- Constituting instrument: Constitution of Cuba (2019)
- Precursor: President of the Council of State
- Formation: 10 October 1940; 85 years ago
- First holder: Carlos Saladrigas Zayas
- Unofficial names: Premier
- Website: www.cubagob.cu

The prime minister of Cuba (Spanish: primer ministro de Cuba) is the head of government of Cuba and the chair of the Council of Ministers (cabinet). The prime minister is the third-highest office in Cuba, after the first secretary of the Communist Party of Cuba and the president of Cuba, and the second-highest state office. The position was officially known as the president of the Council of Ministers (Spanish: presidente del Consejo de Ministros) between 1976 and 2019.

== History ==
The office of prime minister was first instituted in 1940 in accordance with the provisions of the Constitution of Cuba as amended in that year. The first prime minister of Cuba was Carlos Saladrigas Zayas (1900–1957), the nephew of former president Alfredo Zayas. The prime minister was also sometimes referred to as "premier" (Spanish: primer). Between 1940 and 1959, Cuba saw fifteen changes of prime minister; Félix Lancís Sánchez exercised the role twice (1944–1945 and 1950–1951) while Fulgencio Batista held the position concurrently with that of president of Cuba for one month (April 1952) following a military coup. Fidel Castro became prime minister in 1959, replacing José Miró Cardona.

On 2 December 1976, a new national constitution, restructuring the government, came into force. Under that constitution, the prime minister's post was effectively merged with that of the president, who headed both the Council of State and the Council of Ministers of Cuba. The 1976 constitution created a governmental structure that partly copied that of the Soviet Union. However, unlike in the Soviet Union, where the Presidium of the Supreme Soviet and the Council of Ministers were chaired by different people, the Cuban Council of State and Council of Ministers were chaired by the same person. Furthermore, unlike English and Russian, Spanish does not distinguish between the terms "chairman/председатель" and "president/президент", translating both as "presidente".

=== Modern role ===
On 24 February 2019, another constitution – Cuba's current – was adopted in a referendum. Under it, the government was again re-organized, and the separate posts of president and prime minister were restored. Manuel Marrero was named prime minister for a 5-year term by President Miguel Díaz-Canel on 21 December 2019, under the new constitutional provisions, and was approved unanimously by the National Assembly to serve the same day.

== Eligibility ==
The position of prime minister reappears in the Cuban Constitution of 2019. Article 142 establishes that the prime minister is responsible to the National Assembly and the president of the Republic, to whom they are accountable and reports on their performance, that of the Council of Ministers, or its Executive Committee. To hold this position, one must be a deputy to the National Assembly of People's Power, be at least thirty-five years of age, enjoy full civil and political rights, be a Cuban citizen by birth, and hold no other citizenship.

== See also ==
- Elections in Cuba
- Council of Ministers (Cuba)
- President of Cuba
  - List of presidents of Cuba
