= Popular Socialist Party (Cuba) =

Cuban communist party active from 1925 to 1961

Popular Socialist Party Partido Socialista Popular
- General Secretary: Blas Roca Calderio (longest-serving)
- Founded: 16 August 1925
- Dissolved: 24 June 1961
- Merged into: Integrated Revolutionary Organizations
- Headquarters: Havana
- Newspaper: Hoy
- Youth wing: Popular Socialist Youth
- Labor wing: Confederación Nacional Obrera de Cuba
- Ideology: Communism; Marxism–Leninism
- National affiliation: Democratic Socialist Coalition (1939–1944)
- International affiliation: Comintern (1925–1943)
- Colors: Red

Party flag

The Popular Socialist Party (Spanish: Partido Socialista Popular, PSP) was a communist party in Cuba that adhered to Marxism–Leninism. It was founded in 1925 as the Cuban Communist Party (Partido Comunista Cubano) by José Miguel Pérez, Carlos Baliño, Alfonso Bernal del Riesgo, and Julio Antonio Mella. The party later merged with the Revolutionary Union (Unión Revolucionaria) to form the Communist Revolutionary Union (Unión Revolucionaria Comunista) on 13 August 1939. The party was renamed Popular Socialist Party on 22 January 1944. Its electoral support peaked later in the decade, but its influence declined during the late 1940s and 1950s.

The party published the daily newspaper Hoy ("Today"), which was banned by the Auténtico government in 1950 and later resumed publication. After the 1959 Cuban Revolution, the PSP supported the government of Fidel Castro and in 1961 merged into the Integrated Revolutionary Organizations.

== History ==
The party was founded in 1925 with the help of Soviet officials. It was formed through a merger of smaller groupings. It immediately became the Cuban representative for the Comintern and would remain a member until its dissolution in 1943.

On 13 August 1939 the party merged with the Revolutionary Union to form the Communist Revolutionary Union; the same year it registered as a political party and helped the Confederación de Trabajadores de Cuba (CTC) get legal recognition. The party supported the first presidency of Fulgencio Batista from 1940 to 1944, primarily due to his early advocacy of strengthening labour laws and labour unions, as well as his pro-Allied stance during World War II. As a result, two of the party's leaders, Juan Marinello Vidaurreta and Carlos Rafael Rodríguez, were successively appointed ministers without portfolio. Party membership reached about 87,000 in 1942.

The party was renamed Popular Socialist Party on 22 January 1944. It formed an alliance with the Orthodox Party in the 1944 general elections, but was defeated by the Auténticos-Republican alliance, winning only four seats in the House of Representatives. They went on to win five seats in the 1946 mid-term elections.

In the 1948 general election, the party proposed Juan Marinello as its presidential candidate. While he finished fourth, the party won five seats in the House elections. It later won four in the 1950 mid-term elections. The PSP's electoral support peaked in 1948, when about 150,000 voters registered a preference for it; by 1953 its probable voting strength had fallen to about 70,000. Membership declined to roughly 20,000 by 1952 and about 7,000 by early 1959.

The Auténticos government under President Carlos Prío Socarrás banned the party's daily newspaper, Hoy, in 1950.

The party was declared illegal by the Batista regime in 1953, but it continued publishing its newspaper. The party was initially critical of Fidel Castro, condemned the 1953 attack on the Moncada Barracks as adventurist, and only joined the guerrilla struggle in mid-1958.

The PSP entered 1959 with low prestige because of its earlier support for Batista and its late, ambiguous opposition to his dictatorship. It supported Fidel Castro but retained its organizational independence from him.

In early January, the party called for the Rebel Army to become the new permanent army, a modest agrarian reform, the development of new markets in the socialist countries, and the restoration of the 1940 Constitution to prepare for democratic elections. It soon also proposed repeal of the constitutional requirement of prior payment for expropriated property, lowering the voting age, extending the franchise to soldiers, return of the Guantánamo naval base, and measures against racial discrimination. The PSP defined the revolution as a patriotic and democratic national liberation and agrarian revolution, while insisting that socialism was not yet on the agenda.

During these first months, the party also argued that the working class, peasantry, urban petty bourgeoisie, and national bourgeoisie all had a place in the revolutionary bloc. In the trade unions, where its older and more experienced cadres gave it influence out of proportion to its size, it initially defended union independence and the right to strike but did not encourage strikes. It also launched a recruitment drive, the "rebel levy", aimed at enrolling fifty thousand young people in its youth section; it later claimed several thousand recruits, though by October the party's organizational secretary conceded that growth had fallen below expectations.

By late in the year, the PSP was opposing many strikes and accepting wage restraint. After Fidel Castro's intervention at the November congress of the Confederación de Trabajadores de Cuba, "unity" unionists backed by the PSP gained control of the CTC leadership.

By April 1960, as the government radicalized, the party now emphasized the "worker-peasant alliance" as the revolution's social base, and its earlier appeals to the national bourgeoisie became less frequent.

In July 1961, the PSP merged with the 26th of July Movement and the Revolutionary Directorate to form the Integrated Revolutionary Organizations (ORI).
