= Pablo García Menocal =

Cuban statesman (1873–1924)

Personal details
- Born: 1873 Villahermosa, Mexico
- Died: March 1924 (aged 50–51) Havana, Cuba
- Party: Conservative Party
- Relations: Mario García Menocal; Aniceto Garcia Menocal
- Occupation: Politician

Military service
- Branch/service: Cuban Liberation Army; Cuban Rural Guard
- Battles/wars: Cuban War of Independence

Pablo Antonio García Menocal y Deop was a Cuban military officer, statesman, and a former quartermaster of the Cuban Rural Guard.

== Biography ==
=== Early history ===
Pablo Antonio García Menocal y Deop was born in the 19th century. His father, Gabriel García-Menocal, had many children, including Pablo García Menocal and his brothers Tomás, Gustavo, Fausto, Gabriel, Serafin, and Mario. His brother Mario García Menocal became the 3rd President of Cuba.

=== Cuban Liberation Army ===
Pablo joined the Cuban Liberation Army in the mid-1890s, fighting in the Cuban War of Independence. He and 19 accomplices were arrested in Penns Grove, New Jersey and taken to Wilmington, Delaware on August 30, 1895, for their involvement in a filibustering expedition to Cuba that violated U.S. neutrality laws. In March 1898, a month before the Spanish–American War, he accompanied his brother on a 200-man march from Holguín to Havana Province, relieving Gen. Alejandro Rodriguez as Chief of the 5th Army Corps operating in the provinces of Matanzas and Havana. After the Treaty of Paris on December 10, 1898, and the intervention of the U.S. Military Government in Cuba, the Liberation Army was disbanded, while the Spanish Civil Guard's exit fueled banditry.

=== Cuban Rural Guard ===
García Menocal and Leonard Wood convened in Havana in December 1899 to form a 350-man rural guard from Cuban War of Independence veterans for law enforcement. Pablo García Menocal was named Major and Quartermaster of the Cuban Rural Guard on May 20, 1901, by Military Governor Wood. Under the U.S. Military Government, he oversaw the distribution of equipment, supplies, and logistical operations for the newly consolidated National Rural Guard. The Rural Guard was responsible for protecting rural districts and maintaining public order in post-independence Cuba.

=== Political career ===
==== Estra Palma Administration ====
During the first term of Cuban President Tomás Estrada Palma, Col. Pablo García Menocal was appointed Cuban consul to Veracruz in Mexico on August 11, 1902. His resignation was sent on November 14, 1904.

==== Menocal Administration ====
On May 20, 1913, Mario, his brother, took office as the third President of Cuba, holding the position until May 20, 1921. Rumors in November 1913 suggested Menocal offered two Cuban warships and led a commission of several Cubans to Nogales, Sonora to confer with Constitutional Army General Venustiano Carranza. By 1914, Pablo García Menocal resided in Bayamo. As a member of the National Conservative Party, he ran as a candidate for Oriente Province and, after the 1914 Cuban parliamentary election, was elected to the Cuban House of Representatives. He worked in the Department of Public Works.

Following the controversial 1916 Cuban general election, former President Gen. José Miguel Gómez rose in arms against the Menocal administration. In March 1917, Pablo Menocal was the commander of the militia forces in Oriente Province. The Menocal forces were encamped in Contramaestre. That year in Santiago de Cuba, Pablo and his brother Fausto García Menocal had been captured and held hostage by the Liberal forces of Gen. Jose Gomez.

He spent the summer with his family in New York in July 1919, and by September, the Cuban congressman boarded the steamer Mexico to head back to Cuba.

== Death ==
Pablo García Menocal died in Havana, Cuba in March 1924. According to police, he took his own life by shooting and had been suffering from ill health.

== Family ==
He married María de la Piedad Martínez y Lufríu, and together they had four children: Teresa, Margarita, Esther, and Martín García Menocal y Martínez.
