= 1908 Cuban general election =

- 14 November 1908
- Presidential election
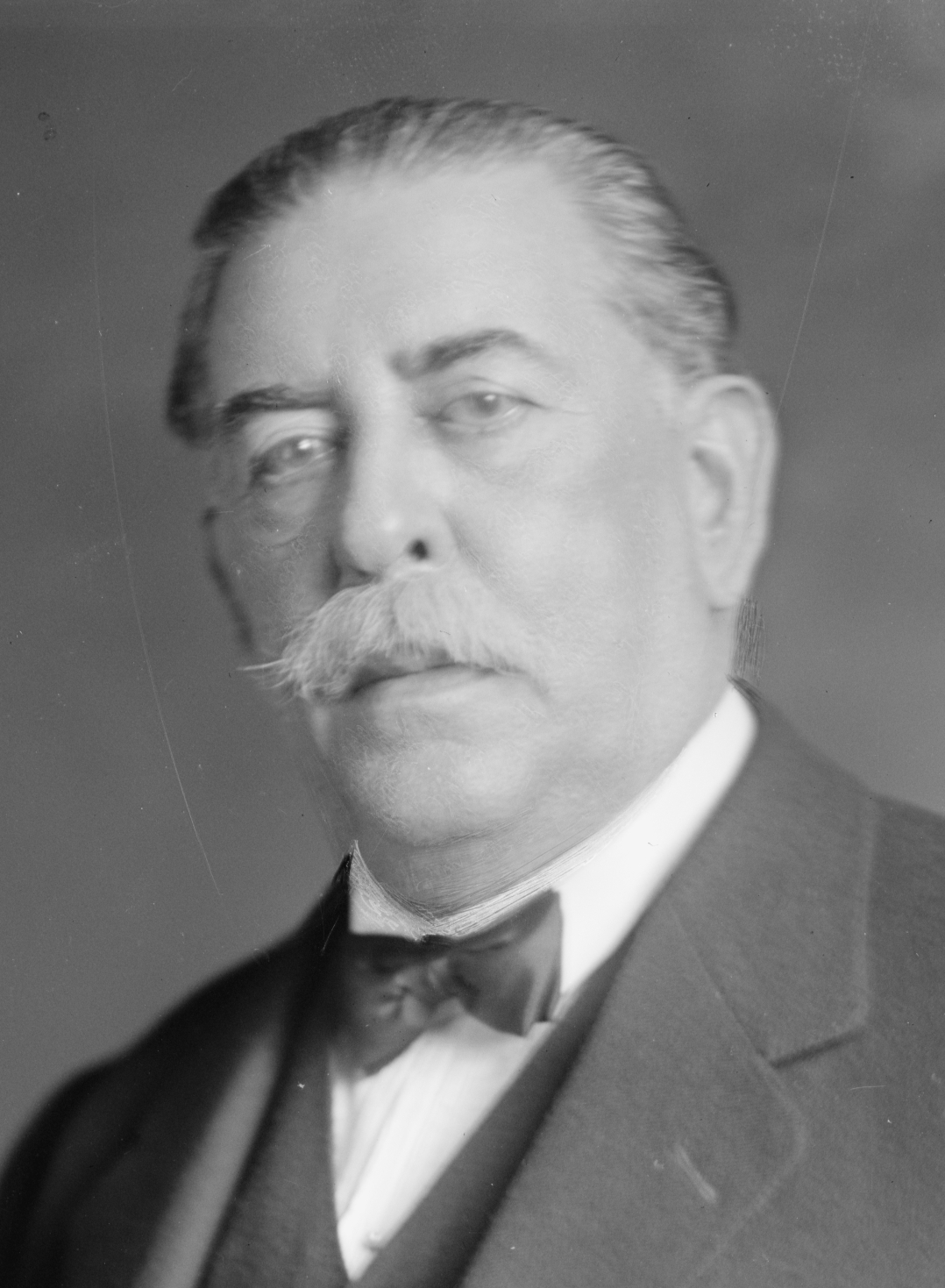

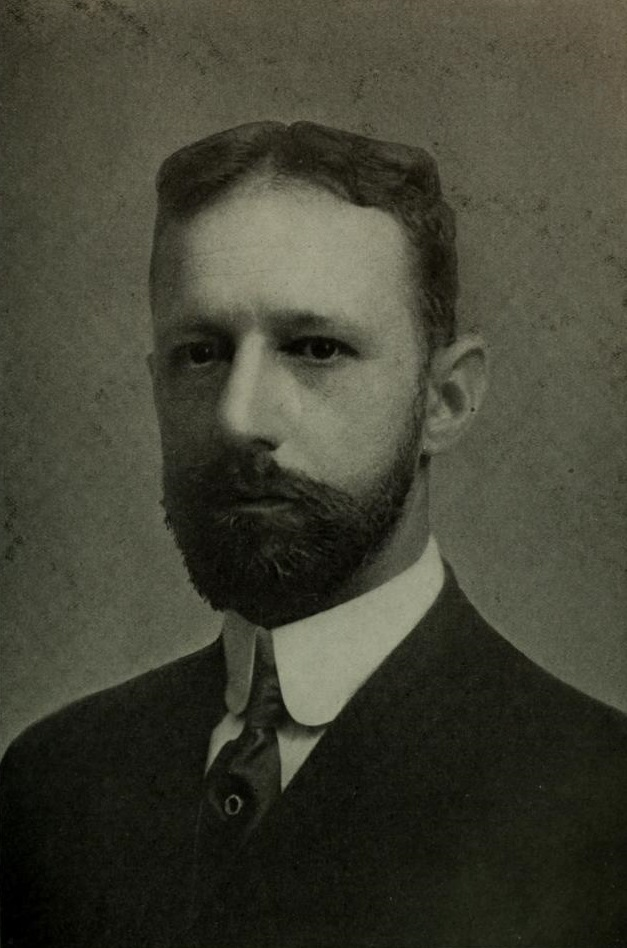
Nominee	José Miguel Gómez	Mario García Menocal
Party	Liberal Coalition	PNC
Popular vote	201,199	130,256
Percentage	60.70%	39.30%
President before election
Tomás Estrada Palma
Republican Party of Havana
Elected President
José Miguel Gómez
Liberal Party of Cuba

General elections were held in Cuba on 14 November 1908. José Miguel Gómez won the presidential election running under the Liberal Coalition banner (an alliance of the Historical Liberal Party and the Zayista Liberal Party), whilst the coalition emerged as the largest faction in the House of Representatives, winning 49 of the 83 seats. Voter turnout was 71.0%.

Of the population of just over two million, less than half a million people were registered to vote.

== Results ==
=== President ===
Candidate	Party	Votes	%
José Miguel Gómez	Liberal Coalition	201,199	60.70
Mario García Menocal	National Conservative Party	130,256	39.30
Total		331,455	100.00
Registered voters/turnout		466,745	–
Source: Nohlen

=== Senate ===
Party or alliance		Seats
Liberal Coalition	Zayista Liberal Party	11
Liberal Coalition	Historical Liberal Party	5
Liberal Coalition	Independents	8
Total		24
Source: Nohlen

The Senators elected were Alberto Nodarse, Antonio Maria Rubio, Manuel Lazo, Miguel Llaneras, Agustin Garcia Osuna, Antonio Gonzalo Perez, Cristobal de la Guardia, Antonio Sanchez de Bustamante, Francisco Cuellar, Luis Fortun, Francisco Diaz Vega, Julian Godinez, Jose Maria Espinoza, Jose B. Aleman, Leopoldo Figueroa, Antonio Berenguer, Nicolas Guillen, Miguel Ramirez Carnesoltas, Salvador Cisneros y Betancourt, Tomas A. Recio, Luis Fernandez Marcane, Fidel G. Pierra, Erasmo Refeuiferos y Gonzalo Perez Andre.

=== House of Representatives ===
Party	Seats
Liberal Coalition	49
National Conservative Party	34
Total	83
Source: Nohlen

The elected members were: Atanasio Hernandez, Estanislao Cartana, Antonio San Miguel, Severo Moleon, jose A. Bec, Pablo Luciano Perez, Eduardo Dolz, jose Llorens, Lorenzo Arias, Juan M. Cabada, Luis Valdes Carrero, Enrique Collazo, Enrique Roig, Manuel Varona Suarez, Felipe Gonzalez Sarrain, Carlos Guas, Jose M. Cortina, Ezequiel Garcia, Miguel F. Viondi, Enrique Messonier, Mario Garcia Kohly, Francisco Pineiro, Jose Pereda Galvez, Rodolfo del Castillo, Ambrosio Borges, Carlos Armenteros Cardenas, Antonio Pardo Suarez, Jose A. Gonzalez Lanuza, Tomas Fernandez Boada, Santiago Cancio Bello, Antonio Fernandez Criado, Jose Bruzon Garcia, Ramiro Cuesta, Juan de la Cruz Alsina, Silverio Sanchez Figueras, Celso Cuellar del Rio, Roque E. Garrigo, Antonio Genova de Zayas, Miguel Arango, Juan Gonzalez Novo, Juan Felipe Risquet, Manuel Vera Verdura, Agustin Cruz, Orestes Ferrera, Pedor Albarran, Rafael Martinez Ortiz, Carlos Mendieta, Miguel Suarez, Casimiro Naya, Andres Callejas, Juan Fuentes, Hermenegildo Ponvert, Manuel Rivero, Ignacio Garcia, Salvador Morejon, Juan Bautista Spotorno, Salvador Gonzalez Tellez, Policarpo Madrigal, Miguel Espinosa, Luis Vilardell, Emilio Arteaga, Julio del Castillo, Ramon Boza, Luis Adam Galarreta, Manuel Lores, Manuel Estrada, Jose Pino Arrue, Bernardo Manduley, Jose Garcia Feria, Jose Pagliery, Carlos Gonzalez Clavel, Alberto Castellanos, Antonio Masferrer, Guillermo Fernandez Mascaro, Tranquilino Palencia, Manuel Fernandez Guevara, Santiago Ledo, Lino Dou, Francisco Audivert, Rafael Serra, Agustin Cebreco and Manuel Giraudy.
