= 1920 Cuban general election =

- 1 November 1920
- Presidential election
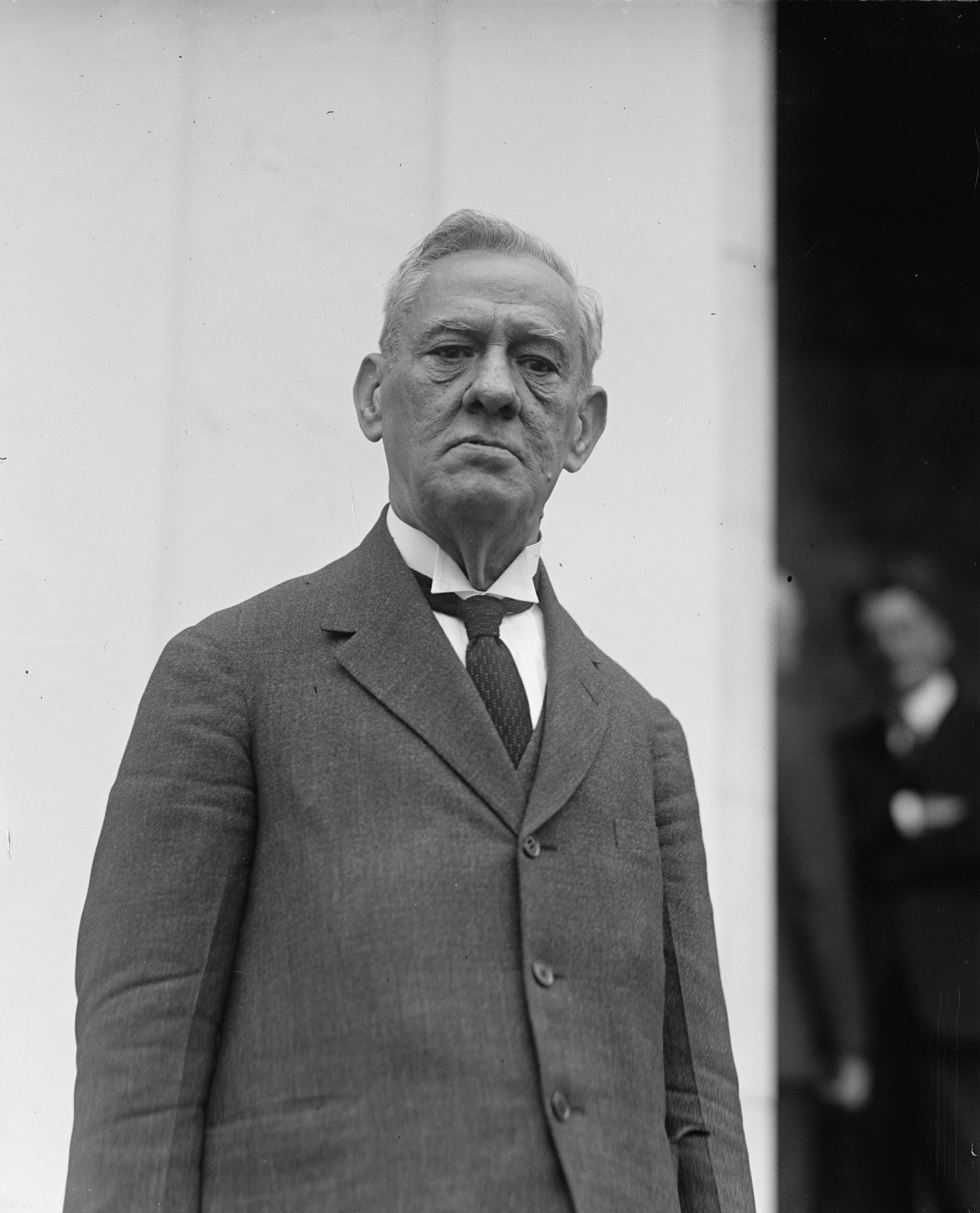

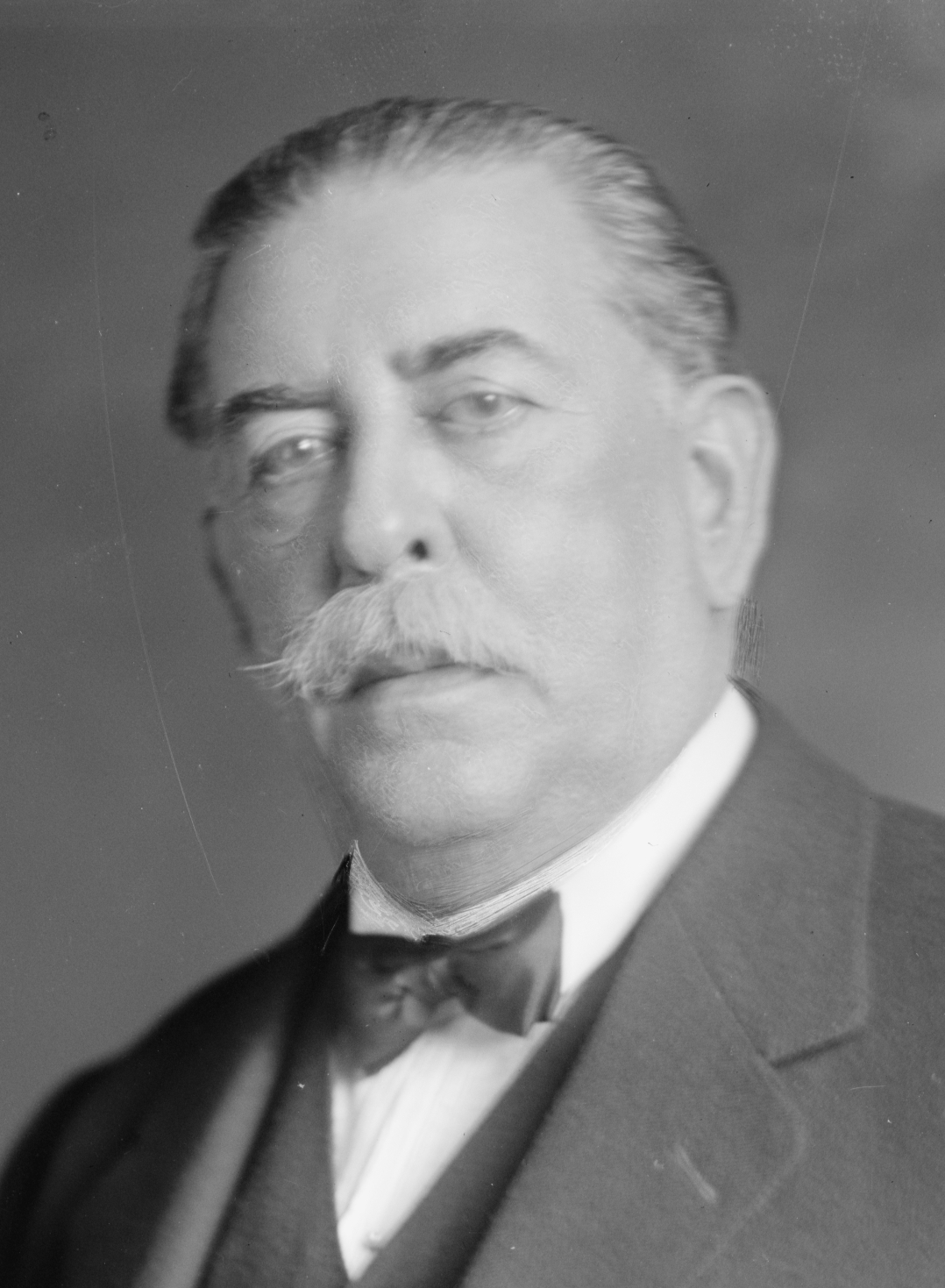
Nominee	Alfredo Zayas y Alfonso	José Miguel Gómez
Party	National League	Liberal
Popular vote	148,278	124,739
President before election
Mario García Menocal
PNC
Elected President
Alfredo Zayas y Alfonso
National League

General elections were held in Cuba on 1 November 1920. Alfredo Zayas y Alfonso won the presidential election, whilst the National League (an alliance of the National Conservative Party and the Cuban Popular Party) emerged as the largest faction in the House of Representatives, winning 31 of the 59 seats.

The Liberal Party accused Zayas and the Conservative Party of election fraud. The U.S. Ambassador to Cuba, Enoch Crowder, substantiated that fraud had occurred. As a consequence, new elections were held in four provinces.

Zayas was inaugurated on May 20, 1921.

== Results ==
=== President ===
Candidate	Party	Votes	%
Alfredo Zayas y Alfonso	National League (PPC–PCN)	148,278	
José Miguel Gómez	Liberal Party of Cuba	124,739	
Total			
Registered voters/turnout		515,353	–
Source: Nohlen

The figures do not include the results for Havana Province due to fraud and subsequent re-runs.

=== Senate ===
Party or alliance		Seats
National League	National Conservative Party	10
National League	Popular Party	1
Liberal Party of Cuba		2
Total		13
Source: Nohlen

=== House of Representatives ===
Party or alliance		Seats
National League	National Conservative Party	26
National League	Popular Party	5
Democratic–Liberal–Nationalist Coalition	Liberal Party of Cuba	28
Democratic–Liberal–Nationalist Coalition	Democratic-Nationalist Party	0
Total		59
Source: Nohlen
