= 1924 Cuban general election =

- 1 November 1924
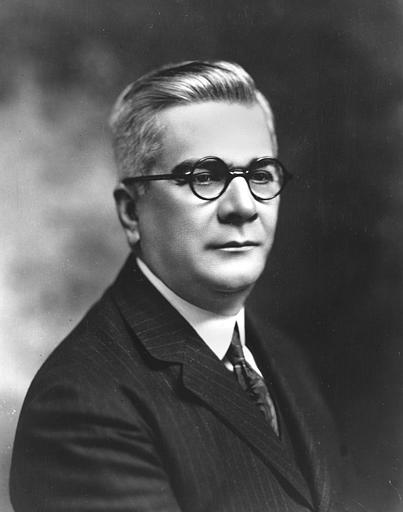

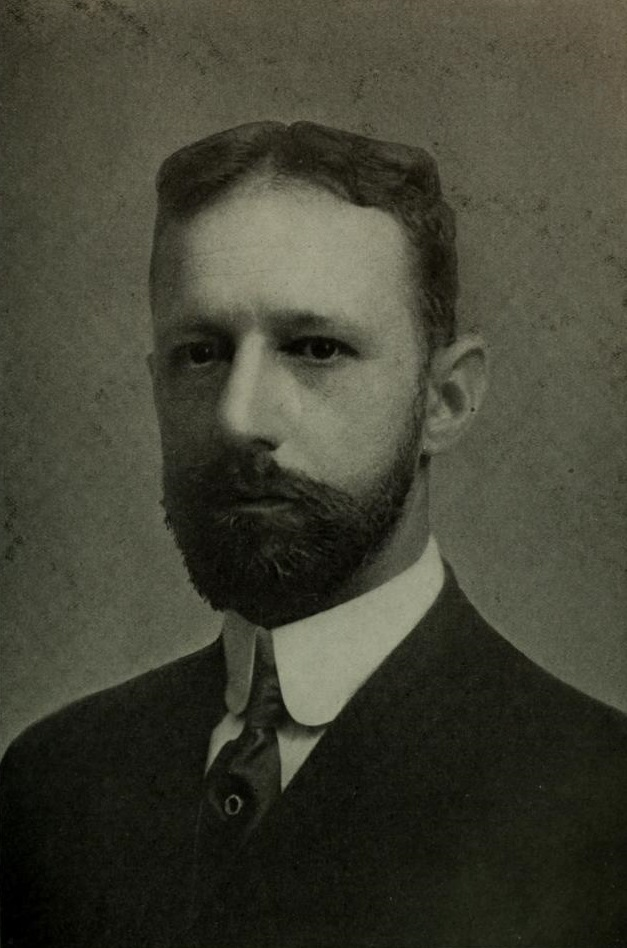
Nominee	Gerardo Machado	Mario García Menocal
Party	Liberal	National Conservative
Popular vote	200,840	134,154
President before election
Alfredo Zayas y Alfonso
Cuban Popular Party
Elected President
Gerardo Machado
Liberal

General elections were held in Cuba on 1 November 1924. Gerardo Machado won the presidential election running under the Liberal–Popular Coalition banner, whilst the coalition also emerged as the largest faction in the House of Representatives, winning 31 of the 53 seats. Following the elections, which were deemed to be fraudulent, Machado established a dictatorship that lasted until he was overthrown in 1933.

== Results ==
=== President ===
Candidate	Party	Votes	%
Gerardo Machado	Liberal–Popular Coalition	200,840	
Mario García Menocal		134,154	
Total			
Source: Nohlen

=== Senate ===
Party	Seats
Liberal Party of Cuba	7
Cuban Popular Party	4
National Conservative Party	1
Total	12
Source: Nohlen

=== House of Representatives ===
Party or alliance		Seats
Liberal–Popular Coalition	Liberal Party of Cuba	27
Liberal–Popular Coalition	Cuban Popular Party	4
National Conservative Party		22
Total		53
Source: Nohlen
