= Consuelo Vázquez Bello =

Cuban politician

Member of the House of Representatives
- In office 1936–1942
- Constituency: Santa Clara Province

Consuelo Vázquez Bello was a Cuban politician. She was elected to the House of Representatives in 1936 as one of the first group of women to enter Congress.

== Biography ==
The sister of Clemente Vázquez Bello, President of the Senate from 1925 to 1932, Vázquez was a Liberal Party candidate for the House of Representatives in Santa Clara Province in the 1936 general elections, the first in which women could vote, and was one of seven women elected. She was the first woman to submit a bill, presenting one on agrarian reform, although it failed to be approved. She was re-elected in 1938, serving in the House until 1942.
