= 1910 Cuban parliamentary election =

Mid-term parliamentary elections were held in Cuba on 1 November 1910 in order to fill half the seats in the House of Representatives. The Liberal Party was the biggest winner, taking 23 of the 41 seats. Voter turnout was 69%.

== Results ==
Party	Votes	%	Seats
Liberal Party of Cuba			23
National Conservative Party			18
Total			41
Total votes	352,424	–	
Registered voters/turnout	512,652	68.75	
Source: Nohlen
