= Chambelona War =

1917 armed conflict in Eastern Cuba

Cambelona War
- Part of the Banana Wars
Date	1917
Location	Cuba
Result	Rebellion suppressed

Belligerents
Cuba; United States	Liberal Party of Cuba

Commanders and leaders
Mario García Menocal; Captain Melchor Batista; Julio Cadenas; Miguel Cutilla	José Miguel Gómez; Miguel Mariano Gómez; Gerardo Machado; Carlos Machado; Gustavo Caballero †; Nicolás Guillén †

The Chambelona War, or the Chambelona Revolution (Spanish: la Revolución de La Chambelona), was an armed conflict in Cuba in 1917, triggered by a dispute over the legitimacy of the 1916 presidential elections. The war was fought primarily between the Liberal Party, which alleged electoral fraud, and the Conservative government of President Mario García Menocal. The conflict derived its name from the popular song La Chambelona, which became an anthem for the Liberal rebels. The war occurred within the broader context of the Sugar Intervention, and U.S. political and economic influence in Cuba following the Platt Amendment, which granted the United States the right to intervene in Cuban affairs. The Chambelona War was contained mostly to the Eastern provinces of Cuba, and did not touch provinces in the West of Cuba.

== History ==
The hostilities began when the Liberal Party, led by José Miguel Gómez, a former president of Cuba, took up arms against Menocal's administration, accusing it of rigging the elections. The Liberals mobilized irregular forces in Las Villas Province, Camagüey Province, and Oriente Province, aiming to overthrow the Conservative government. In response, the Cuban government, with indirect backing from the United States, deployed its military forces to suppress the rebellion.

On his march through the countryside, José Miguel stopped the march and danced La chambelona in the park in the town of Majagua. An Afrocuban lieutenant, without anyone ordering him, set fire to the Jatibonico bridge.

On March 8, 1917, José Miguel Gómez was arrested in Caicaje along with his son Miguel Mariano and the entire escort. Gómez was then transferred to Havana, where he was interned in the Prince's Castle.

On April 7, 1917, Cuba declared war on Germany, officially entering into World War I.

The next day, on Easter Sunday of 1917, approximately 3,500 Liberal troops passed through Omaja, engaging in a major battle with government forces. Another significant skirmish occurred at the Vista Alegre plantation in the same municipality. Near Victoria de Las Tunas, conflict erupted on the Charles Milligan plantation, where Milligan's home was burned down, along with the properties of three other American families.

The fighting severely disrupted transportation and trade. Several railroad stations, including those in Bartle, Jobabo, Minas, and Nuevitas, were set on fire, and train service between Camagüey and Antilla was halted from February to July, crippling citrus and sugar exports.

The United States-owned sugar plantations in the Las Tunas region suffered extensive damage. The Jobabo sugar mill was set ablaze, destroying cane fields and resulting in the loss of the equivalent of 200,000 sacks of sugar. The Elias mill lost 100,000 sacks, while the Manatí, Delicias, and Francisco mills suffered losses in the millions of arrobas of cane.

On April 4, 1917, Cuban government troops, when responding to the Liberal presence at the Jobabo Sugar Mill, gunned-down migrant laborers and Liberal combatants in became known as the "Jobabo Massacre."

In Camagüey, armed Liberal forces looted properties belonging to American settlers in the Cubitas Valley. In response, the Cuban government deployed 100 soldiers to La Gloria for protection, while the U.S. government briefly stationed the USS Eagle to safeguard the port. However, many American families fled the region, seeking refuge in La Gloria. When they returned to Garden City two months later, they found their homes and citrus groves destroyed.

The Florida-Mijial and Galbis colonies in Camagüey also suffered heavy losses. Homes, cattle, groves, and cane fields were devastated, leading many colonists to return to the United States. By May 1917, only two American families remained in Florida-Mijial, a once-thriving colony, and by July, Galbis was in a similar state of decline. A resident of Omaja later speculated that the town may have faced the same fate if not for an unexpected heavy rainfall, which seemingly halted an imminent attack.

Despite widespread insurgency, the Liberal forces ultimately failed to seize control of key territories. The United States, concerned about instability in Cuba, ensured the security of foreign sugar investments by supporting Menocal's government.

By mid-1917, the rebellion had been crushed, and many Liberal leaders, including Alfredo Zayas, were arrested or fled into exile. In Santa Clara, brothers Carlos and Gerardo Machado surrendered, and Zayas was arrested in Cambute. However, Zayas later returned to politics and won the 1920 presidential election, though that election was also marred by allegations of fraud.

The Mambí general Gustavo Caballero and the former senator Nicolás Guillén were both killed.

Menocal commuted the sentence of most prisoners to life in prison, and shortly after pardoned them all, even José Miguel, who spent 11 months behind bars. Elected officials who took up arms were also pardoned, but were prevented from taking office.
