= 1912 Cuban general election =

- 1 November 1912
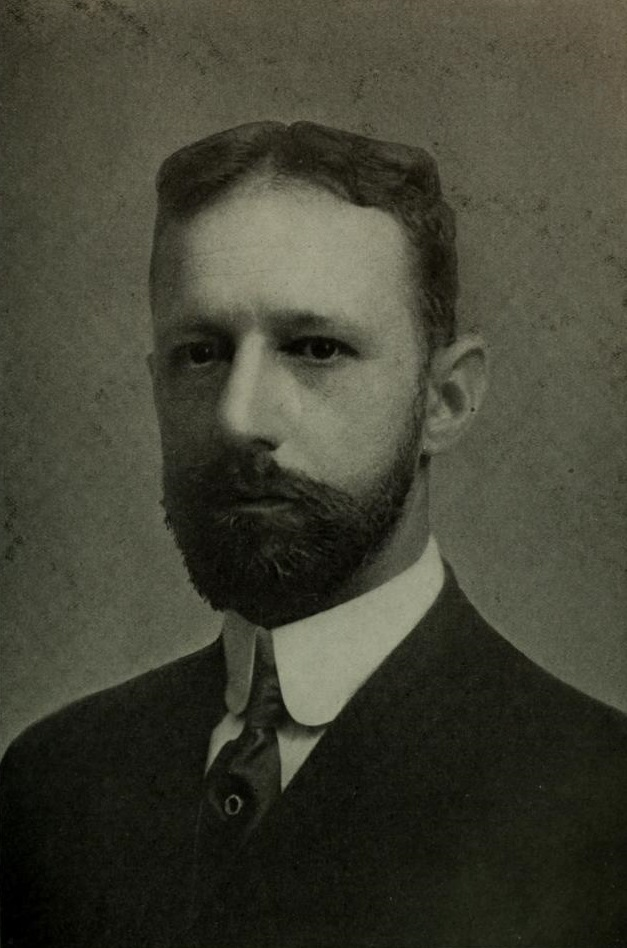

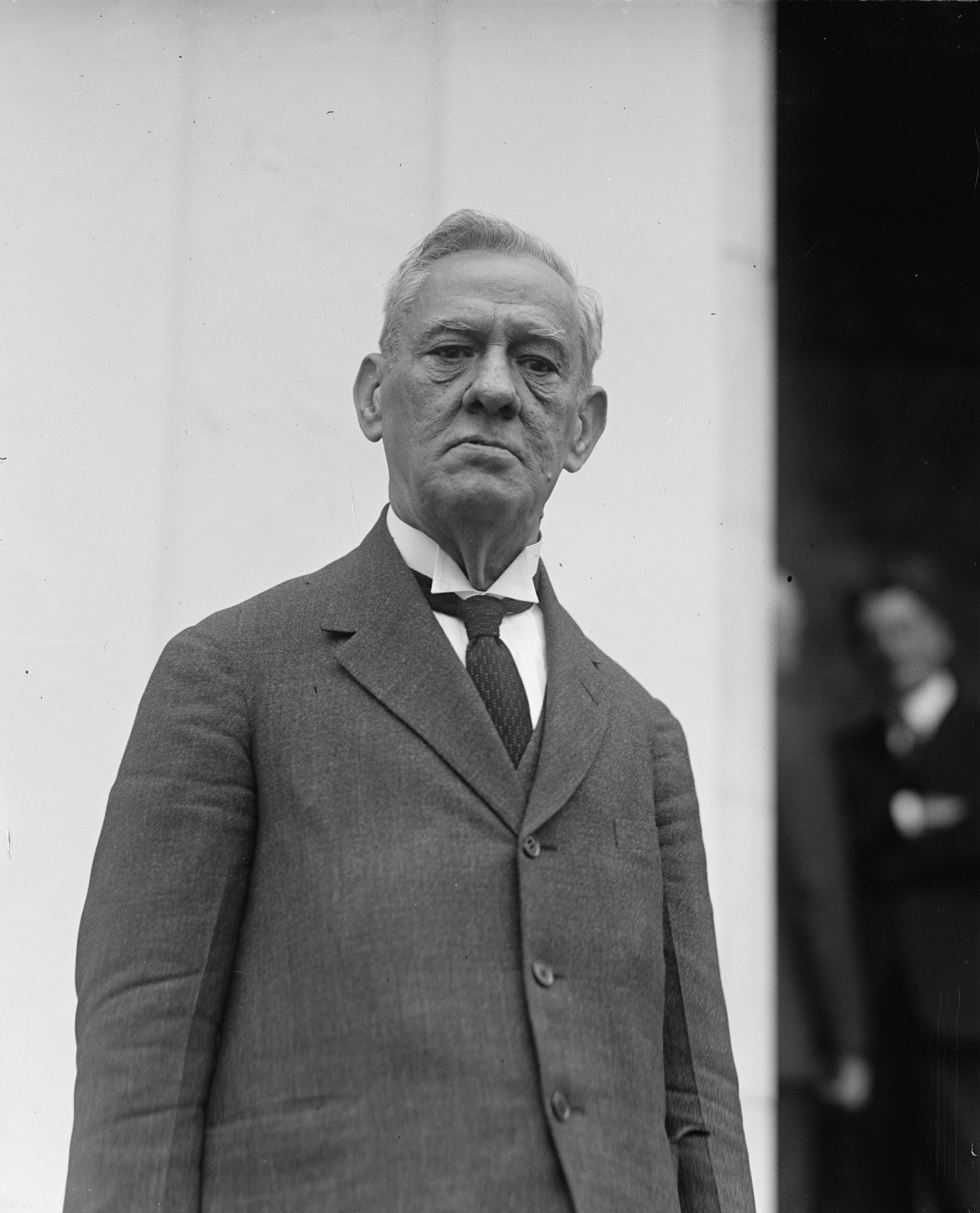
Nominee	Mario García Menocal	Alfredo Zayas y Alfonso
Party	Conjunción Patriótica	Liberal
Popular vote	195,504	180,640
President before election
José Miguel Gómez
Liberal
Elected President
Mario García Menocal
Conjunción Patriótica

General elections were held in Cuba on 1 November 1912. Mario García Menocal won the presidential election running under the Conjunción Patriótica banner (an alliance of the National Conservative Party and the National Liberal Party), whilst the alliance also emerged as the largest faction in the House of Representatives, winning 26 of the 50 seats.

== Results ==
=== President ===
Candidate	Party	Votes	%
Mario García Menocal	Conjunción Patriótica (PCN–PLN)	195,504	
Alfredo Zayas y Alfonso	Liberal Party of Cuba	180,640	
Total			
Registered voters/turnout		628,356	–
Source: Nohlen

=== Senate ===
Party or alliance		Seats
Conjunción Patriótica	National Conservative Party	7
Conjunción Patriótica	National Liberal Party	4
Liberal Party of Cuba		2
Total		13
Source: Nohlen

=== House of Representatives ===
Party or alliance		Seats
Conjunción Patriótica	National Conservative Party	18
Conjunción Patriótica	National Liberal Party	8
Liberal Party of Cuba		24
Total		50
Source: Nohlen
