= 1914 Cuban parliamentary election =

Midterm parliamentary elections were held in Cuba on 1 November 1914 in order to fill half the seats in the House of Representatives, as well as a single seat in the Senate. The National Conservative Party was the biggest winner, taking 22 of the 49 House seats and the sole Senate seat.

== Results ==
=== House of Representatives ===
Party	Seats
National Conservative Party	22
Liberal Party of Cuba	15
Unionist Liberal Party	9
Provincial Liberal Party	2
Cuban National Party	1
Total	49
Source: Nohlen

==== Candidates for Representatives of La Habana Province ====
National Conservative Party (NCP)

- Gustavo Pino
- Raul de Cardenas (Incumbent)
- Miguel Coyula (Incumbent)
- Alfredo Betancourt Manduley
- Federico G. Morales (Incumbent)
- Felipe Gonzalez Sarrain (Incumbent)
- Gonzalo Freyre de Andrade

Liberal Party of Cuba (LPC)

- Eugenio L. Azpiazo
- Generoso Campos Marquetti
- Juan Gualberto Gómez
- Benito Lagueruela
- Carlos Guas Pagueras

Unionist Liberal Party (ULP)

- Manuel Varona Suárez
- Miguel Maniano Gómez
- Enrique Roig (Incumbent)

Cuban National Party (CNP)

- José d'Estrampes

==== Candidates for Representatives of Pinar del Rio Province ====
National Conservative Party
Candidates*	Status	Votes**
Wifredo Fernández Vega	Incumbent Winner	36,940
Francisco Galatas Errasti	Won Race	25,047
José Baldor Valdés	Won Race	25,122
Narciso Camejo Pimienta	Lost Race	10,030
Alfonso Masón García	Lost Race	8,879

Liberal Party of Cuba
Candidates	Status	Votes
Armando del Pino Sandrino	Won Race	22,708
Estanislao Cartañá Borrell	Won Race	17,927
Ramón Vidal Díaz	Lost Race	17,700
José Lazo Rodríguez	Lost Race	7,156
Alfredo Veliz Muñoz	Lost Race	9,690

Unionist Liberal Party
Candidates	Status	Votes
César Madrid Vega	Lost Race	5,515
Ramón Hernández	Lost Race	9,082
Virgilio Rayneri	Lost Race	7,488
Modesto Gómez Rubio	Lost Race	6,920
Ibrahim Urquiaga Arrastía	Lost Race	7,963

==== Candidates for Representatives of Matanzas Province ====
National Conservative Party
Candidates	Status	Votes
Gustavo G. Menocal Deon	Incumbent Winner	19,434
Domingo Lecuona Mádam	Won Race	21,761
Alfredo González Benard	Incumbent Loser	17,474
Miguel Arango Mantilla	Incumbent Loser	18,521
Eduardo García Vigoa	Lost Race	14,872

Liberal Party of Cuba
Candidates	Status	Votes
Nemesio Busto Delgado	Incumbent Loser	14,614
Juan Gronlier Sardiñas	Won Race	16,006
Celso Cuóllar del Rio***	Incumbent Winner	17,452
Francisco Santiago Hernández	Lost Race	13,056
Antonio Génova de Zayas	Incumbent Loser	11,975

^{***Diario de la Marina places Celso with the Liberal Party of Cuba, while Crónica Cubana places him with the Liberal Unionist Party.}

Liberal Unionist Party
Candidates	Status	Votes
Agustín Mederos Lens	Lost Race	13,068
Enrique González Gómez	Lost Race	6,116
Silverio Sánchez Figueras	Lost Race	10,067
Roque E. Garrigó Salido	Lost Race	11,385
Fidel Fundora Vega	Won Race	15,373

==== Candidates for Representatives of Santa Clara Province ====
National Conservative Party
Candidates	Status	Votes
Joaquín R. Torralbas de la Cruz	Incumbent Loser	24,012
Manuel Rivero Gándara	Incumbent Winner	48,096
Antonio Cazañas Gómez	Lost Race	36,029
Juan Jiménez Casto Palomino	Lost Race	33,710
Oscar Soto Calderón de la Barc	Incumbent Loser	26,509
Rafael L. Mariscal Domínguez	Lost Race	22,421
Carlos Robau López	Incumbent Winner	33,953
Rafael Cabrera Sánchez	Lost Race	29,326
José A. Hernández Fales	Lost Race	26,534
Pedro Pamps Camps	Lost Race	39,107
Justo Carrillo Morales	Won Race	41,234

Liberal Unionist Party
Candidates	Status	Votes
Orestes Ferrara Marino	Incumbent Winner	54,347
Andrés García Santiago	Incumbent Winner	36,550
Antonio Calvo Cárdenas	Lost Race	19,553
Roberto Méndez Peñate	Lost Race	47,868
Manuel J. Delgado Delgado	Incumbent Loser	23,195
André Calleja Capote	Lost Race	24,038
Ricardo Campos Martínez	Lost Race	38,504
Mario García Madrigal	Lost Race	23,880
Fernando J. del Pino	Lost Race	27,811
Pablo Lezcano Larrondo	Lost Race	24,019
Juan Fuentes Borges	Lost Race	19,219

Liberal Party of Cuba
Candidates	Status	Votes
Eduardo Guzmán Macías	Incumbent Loser	2,006
Carlos Calonga López	Lost Race	3,890
Félix Arias Segrera	Lost Race	1,225
Casimiro Haya Serrano	Lost Race	2,603
Fortunato Sánchez Osorio	Lost Race	1,139
Ernesto Collado Castillo	Lost Race	1,108
Manuel J. de Carrerá Sterling	Lost Race	1,193
Isidoro Tristá Pérez	Lost Race	1,541
Antonio Rojas Oria	Lost Race	1,446
Juan A. Espinosa Espinosa	Lost Race	1,182
Andrés Pereira Torres	Lost Race	1,244

Other Elected Representatives of Santa Clara Province

- Roberto Mendez Pendant (ULP)

==== Candidates for Representatives in Oriente Province ====
National Conservative Party
Candidates	Status	Vote
Luis A. Milanés Tamayo	Won Race	38,801
Manuel Giraudy Vivar	Won Race	32,255
Miguel López García	Lost Race	31,199
Pablo García Menocal Deop	Won Race	36,366
Calixto Enamorado	Won Race	27,616
Francisco Alvarez Lago	Lost Race	23,053
Juan P. Sánchez Silveira	Lost Race	18,769
Wilfredo Albanés Peña	Lost Race	29,024
Arístides García Gómez	Lost Race	26,233
Félix del Prado Jiménez	Won Race	35,696
Francisco Gutiérrez Barroso	Lost Race	25,378
Eduardo González Manet	Lost Race	30,124

Liberal Party of Cuba
Candidates	Status	Votes
Sebastián Planas Mojena	Won Race	26,614
Arturo de Feria Salazar	Won Race	32,499
Justo R. Canipiña	Incumbent Loser	20,111
Manuel León Valdés	Won Race	32,227
Manuel Plana Rodriguez del Rey	Lost Race	26,839
Enrique Samuel Duany	Won Race	30,046
Ibrahím Arias Gutiérrez	Lost Race	30,689
Idelfonso Llamas Cobos	Lost Race	17,931
Alberto Duboy Castillo	Lost Race	27,078
José R. Barceló Reyes	Won Race	37,788
Alberto Castellanos	Lost Race	19,065
Rogelio Robianas Arquimbau	Lost Race	20,457

Other Elected Representatives of Oriente Province

- Manuel Diaz Ramirez (Liberal Provincial)
- Eduardo Beltran Moreno (Liberal Provincial)

==== Elected Representatives of Camagüey Province ====
- Julio C. del Castillo (LPC) (Incumbent)
- Aurelio Alvarez (NCP)

^{* Underline indicates that a candidate was elected to a seat in the Senate.}

^{** Votes come from a source that reported on November 6, and may not have been completely tabulated at the time of reporting.}

== Allegations of Fraud ==
Although there were initial reportings of a steady and well-organized election, later information would come to dispute that, starting with a controversy regarding whether or not President Mario Menocal should have been allowed to vote, due to him having failed to register in the district that he lived in. Later evidence would come forth showing an election that was tampered with ballot harvesting and voter fraud.

As reported by the Journal Gazette, allegations of fraud were rampant following the conclusion of the election. It was reported that there was a <10% voter turnout, yet the La Habana Province saw a voter turnout of 1,200,000, despite the fact that 7 years prior, the entire population of Cuba was barely above 2,000,000 people. Votes were alleged to be sold in lots for $200. Despite calls for an annulment of the election due to fraud, the election was not recalled. It is generally believed that the election was, at least in party, fraudulent. The Wilkes-Barre Semi-Weekly Record, while not reporting fraud, echoed similar concerns of inconsistency and suspicion regarding population issues in La Habana province.

The Baltimore Sun reported similar claims. 2 days after the election, the 10% voter turnout statistics had been leaked. It was also recorded that some of the alleged voter fraud contained the names of dead men, such as Evaristo Estenoz, who had died a 4 years before the election during the Negro Rebellion. Later, it was reported that the Senate had failed to fill a quorum, and a message written by President Menocal regarding the state of the agricultural sector's economy. Earlier in the year, the Sun had reported on fraudulent votes within the senate, stating that in the process to elect a Speaker of the House back on August 31 had 3 more votes cast than there were members in Congress, leading to more suspicion that the 1914 nationwide election could have been tampered with.

Official Vote Count of La Habana Province**
Party	Votes
National Conservative Party	349,115
Liberal Party of Cuba	338,086
Liberal Unionist Party	253,239
National Party of Cuba	89,130
Federal Worker's Party	10,773
Republican Party	36,380
Party for Morale	23,893
