= María Antonia Quintana Herrero =

Cuban pedagogue and politician

Member of the House of Representatives
- In office 1936–1944
- In office 1955–1959
- Constituency: Santa Clara Province

María Antonia Quintana Herrero was a Cuban pedagogue and politician. She was elected to the House of Representatives in 1936 as one of the first group of women to enter Congress, serving until 1944, and again from 1955 to 1959.

== Biography ==
A doctor of pedagogy, she was a Republican Action candidate for the House of Representatives in Santa Clara Province in the 1936 general elections, the first in which women could vote. She was one of seven women elected. She was re-elected in 1938 as a Democratic National Association candidate, and in 1942 as a Liberal Party candidate, serving until 1944. She returned to the House of Representatives in 1955 after being elected for the Liberal Party in the 1954 elections, serving until 1959.
