= 1922 Cuban parliamentary election =

Mid-term parliamentary elections were held in Cuba on 1 November 1922 in order to fill half the seats in the House of Representatives. The Liberal Party was the biggest winner, taking 28 of the 57 seats.

== Results ==
Party	Seats
Liberal Party of Cuba	28
National Conservative Party	25
Cuban Popular Party	4
Total	57
Source: Nohlen
