= 1930 Cuban parliamentary election =

Mid-term parliamentary elections were held in Cuba on 1 November 1930 in order to fill half the seats in the House of Representatives, as well as 24 seats in the Senate. The Liberal Party was the biggest winner, taking 28 of the 59 seats in the House and 18 of the 24 seats in the Senate.

== Results ==
=== Senate ===
Party	Seats
Liberal Party of Cuba	18
National Conservative Party	6
Total	24
Source: Nohlen

=== House of Representatives ===
Party	Seats
Liberal Party of Cuba	28
National Conservative Party	23
Cuban Popular Party	8
Total	59
Source: Nohlen
