= Carlos Machado =

Carlos Machado may refer to:

- Carlos Machado (fighter), Brazilian jiu-jitsu
- Carlos Machado (table tennis) (born 1980), Spanish table tennis player
- Carlos Machado, brother of Gerardo Machado
