= 1936 Cuban general election =

- 10 January 1936
- Presidential election
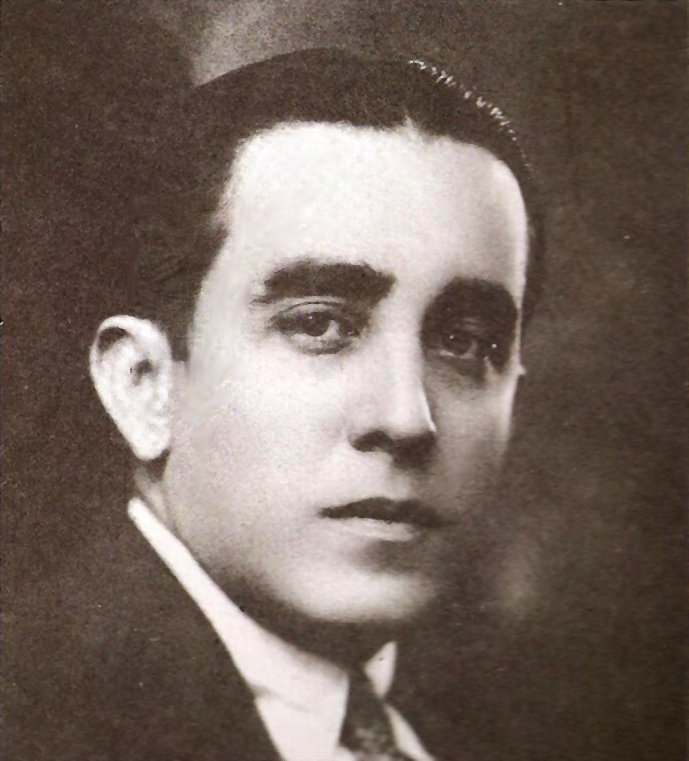

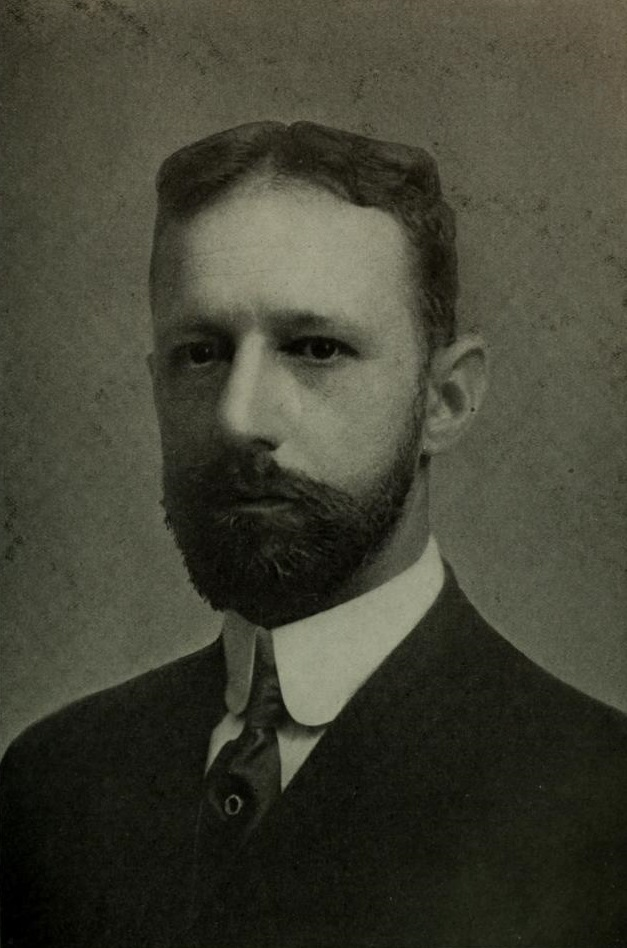
Nominee	Miguel Mariano Gómez	Mario García Menocal
Party	Tripartite Coalition	CND
Popular vote	343,289	256,606
President before election
José Agripino Barnet
Liberal
Elected President
Miguel Mariano Gómez
Tripartite Coalition

General elections were held in Cuba on 10 January 1936. Miguel Mariano Gómez of the Tripartite Coalition (an alliance of the Liberal Party, the Nationalist Union and Republican Action) won the presidential election, whilst the Coalition also emerged as the largest party in the House of Representatives. The elections were the first in which women could vote, and voter turnout was 67.1%.

== Results ==
=== President ===
Candidate	Party	Votes	%
Miguel Mariano Gómez	Tripartite Coalition (PL–UN–AR)	343,289	
Mario García Menocal	Democratic National Association	256,606	
Total			
Total votes		1,123,848	–
Registered voters/turnout		1,675,813	67.06
Source: Nohlen

=== Senate ===
Party or alliance		Seats
Tripartite Coalition	Liberal Party of Cuba	10
Tripartite Coalition	Nationalist Union	9
Tripartite Coalition	Republican Action	5
Democratic National Association		12
Total		36
Source: Nohlen

=== House of Representatives ===
Seven women were elected to the House of Representatives – Rosa Anders Causse, María Caro Más, María Gómez Carbonell, María Antonia Quintana Herrero, Balbina Remedios, Herminia Rodríguez Fernández and Consuelo Vázquez Bello – becoming the country's first Congresswomen.

Party or alliance		Seats
Tripartite Coalition	Liberal Party of Cuba	35
Tripartite Coalition	Nationalist Union	30
Tripartite Coalition	Republican Action	25
Democratic National Association		70
Cuban Unionist Party		2
Total		162
Source: Nohlen
