= 1918 Cuban parliamentary election =

Mid-term parliamentary elections were held in Cuba on 1 November 1918 in order to fill half the seats in the House of Representatives. The National Conservative Party was the biggest winner, taking 33 of the 61 seats.

== Results ==
Party	Seats
National Conservative Party	33
Liberal Party of Cuba	20
Unionist Liberal Party	6
Provincial Liberal Party	2
Total	61
Source: Nohlen
