= La Chambelona =

Popular Cuban protest song

La Chambelona (English: the lollipop) is a Cuban conga song performed in comparsa that gained prominence during the 1916 presidential campaign. The song's rhythm and lyrics quickly resonated with the populace, leading it to become an anthem for the Liberal Party during their political activities, and it became the namesake for the Chambelona War. "La Chambelona" remains a significant cultural artifact in Cuban history, symbolizing the intersection of music and political expression during a pivotal period in the nation's early 20th-century political landscape.

In 1916, because of its prominence during the election, President Menocal banned the performance of La Chambelona in public.

== Recorded versions and adaptations ==
- 1927 recording performed by Rolando Levia (Sexteto Habanero) found on the album "Grabaciones Completas 1925-1931"
- 1950's recording performed by Celia Cruz
- 1959 recording performed by Los Papines
- 1974 recording performed by Chorolo Y Su Combo
- 1976 recording performed by Cachao
- 2009 recording performed by Ricky Campanelli

=== Yo Bailo La Chambelona ===
Yo Bailo La Chambelona (English: I dance to the lollipop), is a distinctive adaptation and variation of the original song

- 1965 recording by Sonora Habanera De Flores Valdes, featuring Florencio Hernández
- 2002 recording by Chico Álvarez

=== Modern variations ===
- 2023 electronic dance music version performed by Groove Addiction
