= 1928 Cuban Constitutional Assembly election =

Constitutional Assembly elections were held in Cuba on 5 March 1928. The result was a victory for the Liberal Party, which won 29 of the 55 seats.

== Results ==
Party	Seats
Liberal Party	29
National Conservative Party	21
Cuban Popular Party	5
Total	55
Source: Nohlen
