= Rosa Anders Causse =

Cuban lawyer and politician

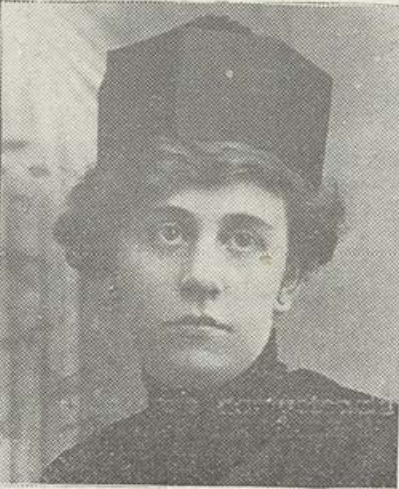
- Causse in 1935

Member of the House of Representatives
- In office 1936–1938
- Constituency: Camagüey Province

Personal details
- Born: Santiago de Cuba, Cuba

Rosa Anders Causse was a Cuban lawyer and politician. She was elected to the House of Representatives in 1936 as one of the first group of women to enter Congress.

== Biography ==
Anders was born in Santiago de Cuba. She was one of the first women to earn a law degree at the University of Havana, and after moving to Camagüey Province, also became the first woman to work as a public defender in Cuba.

She was a Liberal Party candidate for the House of Representatives in Camagüey in the 1936 general elections, the first in which women could vote. She was one of seven women elected, winning by just one vote. She served in the House until 1938.
