= 1932 Cuban parliamentary election =

Mid-term parliamentary elections were held in Cuba on 1 November 1932 in order to fill half the seats in the House of Representatives. The Liberal Party was the biggest winner, taking 35 of the 69 seats.

== Results ==
Party	Seats
Liberal Party of Cuba	35
National Conservative Party	25
Cuban Popular Party	9
Total	69
Source: Nohlen
