= Balbina Remedios =

Cuban lawyer and politician

Member of the House of Representatives
- In office 1936–1938
- Constituency: La Habana Province

Balbina Remedios Langanehin was a Cuban lawyer and politician. She was elected to the House of Representatives in 1936 as one of the first group of women to enter Congress.

== Biography ==
A lawyer, Remedios was a Democratic National Association candidate for the House of Representatives in La Habana Province in the 1936 general elections, the first in which women could vote. She was one of seven women elected, serving in the House until 1938.
