= María Caro Más =

Cuban politician

Member of the House of Representatives
- In office 1936–1940
- Constituency: Oriente Province

María Caro Más de Chácon was a Cuban politician. She was elected to the House of Representatives in 1936 as one of the first group of women to enter Congress.

== Biography ==
In 1918 she became editor of Oriente, a weekly magazine. She later became a professor of public instruction, and served as president of the National Council of the Defence of the Child and head of the National Office of Labor for Women and Minors.

She was a Democratic National Association candidate for the House of Representatives in Oriente Province in the 1936 general elections, the first in which women could vote, and was one of seven women elected. She became the first woman to preside over the House of Representatives on an occasion when both the president and vice president were absent; as she was the oldest member in attendance, she oversaw the session. She served in the House until 1940.

She later became chair of the women's division of the National Progressive Coalition, which supported Fulgencio Batista.
