= Cuban Rural Guard =

Cuban mounted police force

- Guardia Rural Cubana
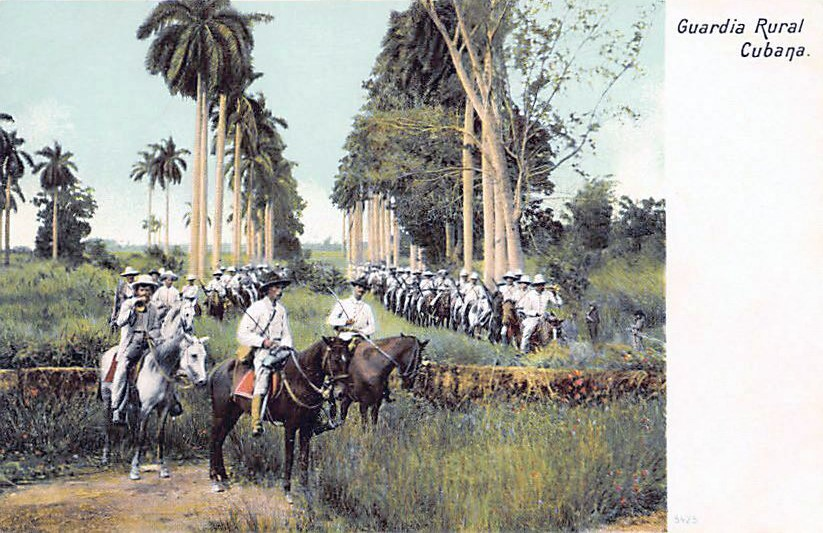
- Active: 1898–1950s
- Country: Cuba
- Branch: United States Military
- Type: Paramilitary
- Garrison/HQ: Santiago de Cuba Province; Puerto Príncipe Province; Santa Clara Province; Pinar del Río Province; La Habana Province

The Cuban Rural Guard (Spanish: Guardia Rural Cubana) or the Rural Guard of the Island of Cuba was a republican paramilitary organization in Cuba established by the Provisional Government of Cuba during the 1890s.

== History ==
=== First occupation of Cuba ===
During the U.S. Government's First Occupation of Cuba, the occupation government led by John R. Brooke and Leonard Wood oversaw the formation of a new constabulary.

Amid the Spanish–American War and the withdrawal of the Spanish troops, the United States Military Government in Cuba sought to address ongoing criminal activity, with Santiago de Cuba being the most affected by banditry. As a substitute to the Spanish Civil Guard in Cuba, the need arose to utilize the disbanded Cuban Liberation Army for local policing duties.

==== Santiago de Cuba ====
In Santiago de Cuba Province on July 11, 1898, 20 men under Capt. Manuel A. Martínez were organized into a paramilitary composed of cavalry known as the "Rural Guard". The Rural Guard covered the four districts of Santiago de Cuba, Guantánamo, Manzanillo, and Holguin. By the end of the month, the guard had expanded to 40 guardsmen, tasked with law enforcement, dismantling bandits, and safeguarding landowners' rural properties.

Once the Rural Guard was formed in the province of Santiago de Cuba, similar companies were organized for police supervision of the rural districts in each province. It was later established in the provinces of Puerto Príncipe, Santa Clara, Pinar del Rio, and La Habana, where a chief of the Rural Guard managed the organization in each province.

==== Holguín ====
In Holguín, on December 1, 1898, the Military Governor of Santiago de Cuba Col. Duncan Norbert Hood, son of John Bell Hood, established the province's Rural Guard to combat the bandits operating in the area.

==== Puerto Príncipe ====
Upon the organization of the guard in the Puerto Príncipe district on January 1, 1899, Military Commander Louis H. Carpenter directed that the forces be provided with Remington carbines and Mauser ammunition from the Liberation Army which had been placed at his disposal in November 1898. Lt. Col. Braulio Peña, holding the rank of Colonel in the Cuban Army's Cavalry, was designated as the Chief of the Rural Guard for Puerto Príncipe Province. Roughly 160 men, drawn from former Liberation Army soldiers and veterans of the War of Independence, were divided into 9 squadrons distributed throughout the province to conduct cavalry patrols and maintain public order.

==== Santa Clara ====
The Rural Guards of the Santa Clara Province were established in a headquarters on April 7, 1899, by order of Gen. John C. Bates who was the military commander of the province. The forces were placed under the command of Col. José de J. Monteagudo acting as the Chief of the Rural Guard of the Province of Santa Clara.

==== La Habana ====
In December 1899, Leonard Wood met with Pablo García Menocal in La Habana Province and began arrangements to organize a rural guard composed of 350 mounted troops of the Cuban army for the protection of the outlying areas of the city.

==== Reorganization ====
By April 11, 1901, the Rural Guards of all provinces were reorganized and consolidated into the National Rural Guard by order of the Military Governor. A commission was appointed on May 7, 1901, with Major Rafael Rodríguez, Acting Inspector General of the Rural Guard, Captain Federico Rasco, formerly Captain and Adjutant in Santa Clara, and Captain Ramon Martin, Adjutant in Havana and Pinar del Rio. On May 20, 1901, Pablo García Menocal was appointed by the Military Governor of Cuba Leonard Wood as Major and Quartermaster of the Rural Guard of the Island of Cuba and Lt. Col. José de J. Monteagudo as Inspector General of the Rural Guard with the rank of Colonel.

==== End of first U.S. occupation ====
The first U.S. occupation of Cuba ended on May 19, 1902, when the Republic of Cuba was established. The U.S. ceded control the next day while keeping intervention rights under the Platt Amendment. The first Cuban Republic under the first elected Cuban president Tomás Estrada Palma inherited the Rural Guard in the form of a force commanded by Brig. Gen. Alejandro Rodriguez, consisting of 1,604 officers stationed at 247 posts across several provinces.

In October 1902, U.S. Envoy Extraordinary and Minister Plenipotentiary Herbert G. Squiers reported the Rural Guard underwent a reorganization and was approved for an expansion from 1,500 to 3,800 officers. Cuban citizens aged 21–45, literate in Spanish, of good character, and physically fit (120-170 lbs, 5'4" or taller), and with no prior criminal convictions or dishonorable discharges were eligible for a requirement of a four-year enlistment. In Military Governor Wood's final 1902 report, he included that the Rural Guard was found sufficient to enforce respect for law in the rural districts of Cuba.

In 1904, with the guard totalling 3,020, President Tomás Estrada Palma suggested a 1,000-man increase in April 1904. The Cuban President, on August 20, 1906, issued an increase of 2,186 officers and men and the merger of the Cuban Artillery Corps with the Rural Guard.

=== Second occupation of Cuba ===
In September 1906, persistent economic challenges and political unrest in the country forced U.S. president Theodore Roosevelt to take charge of Cuba. In the Second Occupation of Cuba, American officials sought to expand the Cuban Rural Guard for stability, enlisting prominent Cuban veterans to form militia companies. An act of Cuban Congress on September 15, 1906, approved a force of 5,305 men and consolidated the Artillery Corps with the Cuban Rural Guard, all being designated the Armed Forces of the Republic. The guard had three regiments covering Havana, Pinar del Rio, Matanzas, Santa Clara, Oriente, and Camagüey. From 142 posts on September 30, 1906, it grew to 315 by the same date in 1907.

In April 1908, the Provisional Government formed the Cuban Permanent Army with 2000 men and retained the Rural Guard, which had 5,180 officers and men in 380 units. A decree called for a reduction in the guardsmen under Maj. Gen. Alejandro Rodríguez to 3,600. The infantry brigade of the Permanent Army was expanded by transfers from the Rural Guard of Cuba. On July 11, 1908, The Cuban Shoemakers' League lodged a protest with Provisional Governor Charles Edward Magoon over the awarding of a $60,000 shoe contract for the Rural Guard to an American factory representative, despite Cubans offering lower prices.

In 1909, additional U.S. intervention resulted in the Rural Guard being placed under U.S. control. From 1909 to 1912, Frank Parker of the U.S. Army rendered services as a military instructor of the cavalry in the Rural Guard of Cuba.

The Afro-Cuban revolt of 20 May 1912 involved the intervention of the Rural Guard of Cuba in its suppression. In June 1912 a combined Government force, made up of the Monteagudo Rural Guard and regular troops, defeated the main rebel force in a major clash. The Rural Guards then pursued the remaining guerrilla bands for several weeks.

=== Subsequent history 1915-1959 ===
In 1915 legislation was passed to merge the Guardia Rural and the Permanent Army into the Ejercito Nacional numbering 13,628 men. The Guardia Rural however retained its constabulary role, organised in separate detachments distributed throughout each of the eight Military Areas. The Guardia totalled 38 squadrons, still generally horse-mounted as late as 1940. By this date the regular army totalled 8,000, against 6,000 Rural Guards. The latter were expected to provide ad hoc Tercios to support the army if required.

In 1952 measures were taken to firmly separate the Rural Guard from the National Army. The Guardia Rural was confirmed as a static gendarmerie style force with law enforcement and internal security responsibilities outside the major urban districts. Mechanised and mounted Guardia cavalry, plus infantry units provided provincial garrisons, as well as augmenting the concentration of regular army troops at Havana.

During the Cuban Revolution the 44 Rural Guard squadrons still nominally in existence played a generally passive garrison role, leaving field action to the anti-guerrilla battalions of the Constitutional Army. With the collapse of the Batista regime the Rural Guard was disbanded, being replaced initially by the Revolutionary Militia and subsequently by the National Revolutionary Police Force plus the Border Troops and the Interior Special Forces.

== Uniforms ==
Initially dressed in white (see photograph above), the Rural Guards subsequently wore khaki cotton uniforms, Mills-pattern cartridge belts, and russet leather shoes and leggings. Their hats resembled U.S. army campaign hats with leather bands, and they carried waterproof coats. Each hat displayed their number and the Guard insignia, which was also worn on their collars. Their saddles and tack were also russet leather.

== Provincial headquarters ==
- Santiago de Cuba Province
- Puerto Príncipe Province
- Santa Clara Province
- Pinar del Río Province
- La Habana Province

== See also ==
- Rurales
