= Herminia Rodríguez Fernández =

Cuban politician

Member of the House of Representatives
- In office 1936–1944
- Succeeded by: Wilfredo Figuero Gonzalez
- Constituency: Camagüey Province

Personal details
- Died: 15 January 1944

Herminia Rodríguez Fernández (died 15 January 1944) was a Cuban politician. She was elected to the House of Representatives in 1936 as one of the first group of women to enter Congress.

== Biography ==
Rodríguez was a Nationalist Union candidate for the House of Representatives in Camagüey Province in the 1936 general elections, the first in which women could vote, and was one of seven women elected. She was re-elected as a Republican Democratic Party candidate in 1940, serving in the House until her death on 15 January 1944.
