= 1926 Cuban parliamentary election =

Mid-term parliamentary elections were held in Cuba on 1 November 1926 to fill half the seats in the House of Representatives.
