= Braulio Peña =

Cuban army colonel (1855-1924)

- Born: Braulio Peña y Cruz; March 26, 1855
- Died: April 25, 1924 (aged 69); Cuba
- Military career
- Allegiance: Cuba
- Branch: Cuban Liberation Army; Cuban Rural Guard (1899-1906)
- Nickname: Cuba's Phil Sheridan
- Conflicts: Ten Years' War; Little War; Cuban War of Independence

Braulio Peña (March 26, 1855 - April 25, 1924) was a Cuban military officer and a former chief of the Cuban Rural Guard of Puerto Príncipe.

== Biography ==
=== Early history ===
Braulio Peña de la Cruz was born in Puerto Príncipe (now Camagüey), Spanish Cuba on March 26, 1855.

=== Ten Years' War ===
By the 1870s, he joined the Ten Years' War, Cuba's first war of independence which began in 1868, becoming a lieutenant colonel.

=== Little War ===
In August 1879, Col. Peña was involved in the Little War under Gen. Emilio Núñez, aligning with the Cuban leaders who refused to sign the Pact of Zanjon.

Following the war's end, he escaped to St. Thomas, later settling in Florida and becoming a cigar maker.

=== Cuban War of Independence ===
At the onset of the Cuban War of Independence, Peña joined the first expedition back and served with Gen. Maximo Gomez. Gomez made him a colonel in the Cuban ranks and in a week he held a command of 300 mambises.

==== Expeditions ====
He organized many armed expeditions for the insurrection from the United States. In March 1895, he boarded the tug Commodore from Charleston, South Carolina in command of an expedition that successfully landed on the island of Cuba. The steamer was libeled for undertaking a foreign voyage, but the case never reached trial. Braulo Peña headed another filibustering expedition to Cuba to aid the military operations in the summer of 1895. He and 20 accomplices were arrested in Penns Grove, New Jersey and taken to Wilmington, Delaware on August 30, 1895, for their involvement in the violation of the U.S. neutrality laws. He faced the United States District Court for the District of Delaware on September 23, 1895, and was later released on bail. In March 1896, under Brigadier Emilio Núñez, Maj. Braulio Peña landed an expedition in Nuevitas of Puerto Principe with eight men including Winchester Osgood, 400 rifles, large amounts of ammunition, and a two-pounder Hotchkiss gun. That year, Máximo Gómez made him a brigadier general and appointed him the chief of cavalry in the Cuban Liberation Army. The cavalry's horses were mostly those stolen from the Spanish troops.

=== Cuban Rural Guard ===
In post-independence Cuba, the U.S. Military Government's appointment and the departure of the Spanish Civil Guard increased banditry, leading to the establishment of the Cuban Rural Guard locally. Lt. Col. Braulio Peña was named Chief of the Rural Guard of Puerto Príncipe (Spanish: Guardia Rural de Puerto Príncipe) on January 1, 1899, when it was assembled in the province. Some 160 Cuban war veterans were selected, forming 9 squadrons for patrols and public order in the rural areas outside of the city limits. Peña, in Maj. Louis V. Caziarc's annual report, was noted as Chief of the Puerto Príncipe Rural Guard from July 1900 to December 1901, under Commander Hatfield. He oversaw 252 officers and men with various staff members including an assistant captain and inspector.

Braulio Peña, Second in Command of the Second Regiment of the Cuban Rural Guard, retired in 1906 due to declining health.

== Death ==
Braulio Peña died in Puerto Príncipe (now Camagüey), Cuba on April 25, 1924.
