= María Gómez Carbonell =

Cuban educator and attorney

Minister without Portfolio
- In office 1942–

Member of the Senate
- In office 1940–1944
- In office 1955–1959
- Constituency: La Habana Province

Member of the House of Representatives
- In office 1936–1940
- Constituency: La Habana Province

María Gómez Carbonell (June 29, 1903 – May 24, 1988) was a Cuban educator and politician. She was one of the first group of seven women elected to Congress, serving in the House of Representatives from 1936 to 1940. In 1940 she became the first woman to be elected to the Senate, and in 1942 was appointed Minister without portfolio, becoming the first woman in a Cuban cabinet. She founded Cruzada Educativa Cubana in 1962, as well as the Alliance of National Feminists.

== Early life ==
Carbonell was born June 29, 1903, in Havana. An only child, her parents were Jose Fernando Gomez Santoyo and Candelaria Carbonell Rivero. Her maternal grandfather, Néstor Leonelo Carbonell Figueroa, as well as three uncles, José Manuel, Néstor, and Miguel Angel were involved in Cuba's politics and society. She was one of the first women to earn a Ph.D. (Doctor of Philosophy and Letters in Cuba) from the University of Havana.

== Career ==
She was a Democratic National Association candidate for the House of Representatives in La Habana Province in the 1936 general elections, the first in which women could vote, and was one of seven women elected. In the 1940 elections she was the first woman elected to the Senate, serving until 1944. She was appointed Minister without Portfolio in 1942, and was still a minister in the late 1950s. She served in the Senate again from 1955 to 1959 for Fulgencio Batista's National Progressive Coalition. During her career in Cuba's Congress, she delivered more than 160 speeches. She founded the Alliance of National Feminists in Cuba, as well as the Cruzada Educativa Cubana in 1962. Described as a "sought-after speaker in the Cuban exile community", she was exiled to the United States in 1959. While in exile in Miami, Florida, she became the founding member of civic organization (CEC) and the also umbrella organization of Municipios de Cuba en el Exilio (Cuban Municipalities in Exile). In the publication called the El Habanero, a Cuban exile periodical, she was Director for the Havana Province.

While in exile in Miami, under the aegis of the Cruzada Educativa Cubana, she organized Cuban Culture Day on 25 November every year when the Juan J. Remos Award was presented to Cubans for their contribution in the cultural and educational fields. The Cuban Teacher Day was also observed in Miami on July 11 every year when the José de la Luz y Caballero (a famous nineteenth century Cuban teacher and philosopher) Award was presented. She also scripted and presented a Spanish-language radio program titled "La Escuelita Cubana" highlighting issues related to Cuban history.

== Death and legacy ==
Carbonell died on May 24, 1988, in Miami, Florida. She is cited as a "community icon in both Cuba and the United States".
