= 1904 Cuban parliamentary election =

Mid-term parliamentary elections were held in Cuba on 28 February 1904 in order to fill half the seats in the House of Representatives. The Conservative Republican Party won the most seats.

== Results ==
Party	Seats
Conservative Republican Party	13
National Liberal Party	10
Radical National Party	5
Moderate National Party	2
Independent Eastern Coalition	1
Total	31
Source: Nohlen
