= Clemente Vázquez Bello =

Cuban politician (1887–1932)

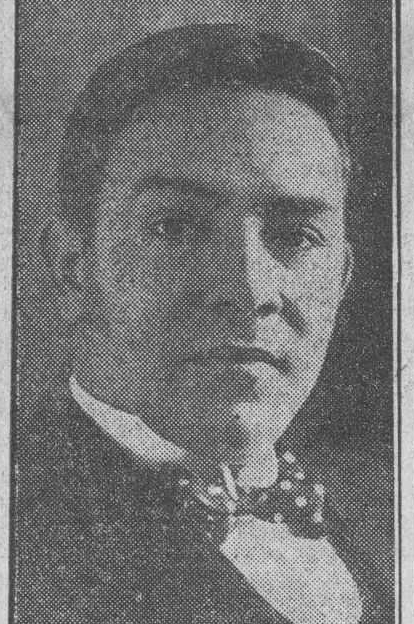

President of the Senate of Cuba
- In office 7 April 1925 – 28 September 1932
- Preceded by: Aurelio Álvarez de la Vega
- Succeeded by: Alberto Barrera Fernández

Personal details
- Born: 23 November 1887
- Died: 28 September 1932 (aged 44)

Clemente Vázquez Bello (23 November 1887 – 28 September 1932) was President of the Cuban Senate from 1925 to 1932, throughout the administration of Gerardo Machado, the Cuban President. Vázquez belonged to the Liberal Party of Cuba and was a key figure in the Machado regime during the 1920s and early 1930s.

From the time he was 23, Vásquez held local office in Santa Clara. He served in the Cuban House of Representatives and was elected as its president from 1923 to 1925. He was elected to the Cuban Senate during the November 1924 elections as Senator for the province of Santa Clara. By 1927, he was president of the Liberal Party and President of the Senate.

In 1930, he responded to the economic crisis posed by an oversupply of sugar by proposing a law for a "national fuel", that is, requiring Cubans to use motor oil based on a mixture of gasoline and alcohol made from sugar. In 1931, he defended Machado from charges that he was responsible for the depression and predicted that the development of more efficient use of sugar by-products would relieve the economic crisis in the sugar market.

He minimized the significance of an attempt to overthrow the government in December 1930: "Many men have deserted their party organizations and refuse to abide by party control, but in my opinion these will tire of offering resistance to constituted authority."

Vázquez was a key figure in the Machado administration and a likely candidate for the presidency of Cuba in the 1934 elections when he was assassinated by members of the ABC (abecedarios) on the afternoon of 28 September 1932. Vázquez, riding in his limousine in Havana, was hit by machine-gun fire. He died on the operating table at Camp Columbia Military Hospital.

Several other political figures were murdered later the same day, apparently in retaliation and on Machado's orders, including three brothers: Representative Gonzalo Freyre de Andrade, Guillermo Freyre de Andrade, an attorney, and Leopoldo Freyre de Andrade, a sugar engineer opposed to Machado's plans for the sugar economy. Representative Miguel Angel Aguiar, who had participated in the unsuccessful revolt against the Machado government in August 1931, was shot four times but survived.

Vázquez was buried on 29 September in Santa Clara, Cuba. The radical group known as ABC had planned to assassinate Machado at Vásquez' funeral in Havana, but their plan was frustrated when the Vásquez family chose Santa Clara for the burial. His sister Consuelo was elected to House of Representatives in 1936 as one of the first group of women to enter Congress.
