= Martín Morúa Delgado =

Cuban statesman and writer (1857–1910)

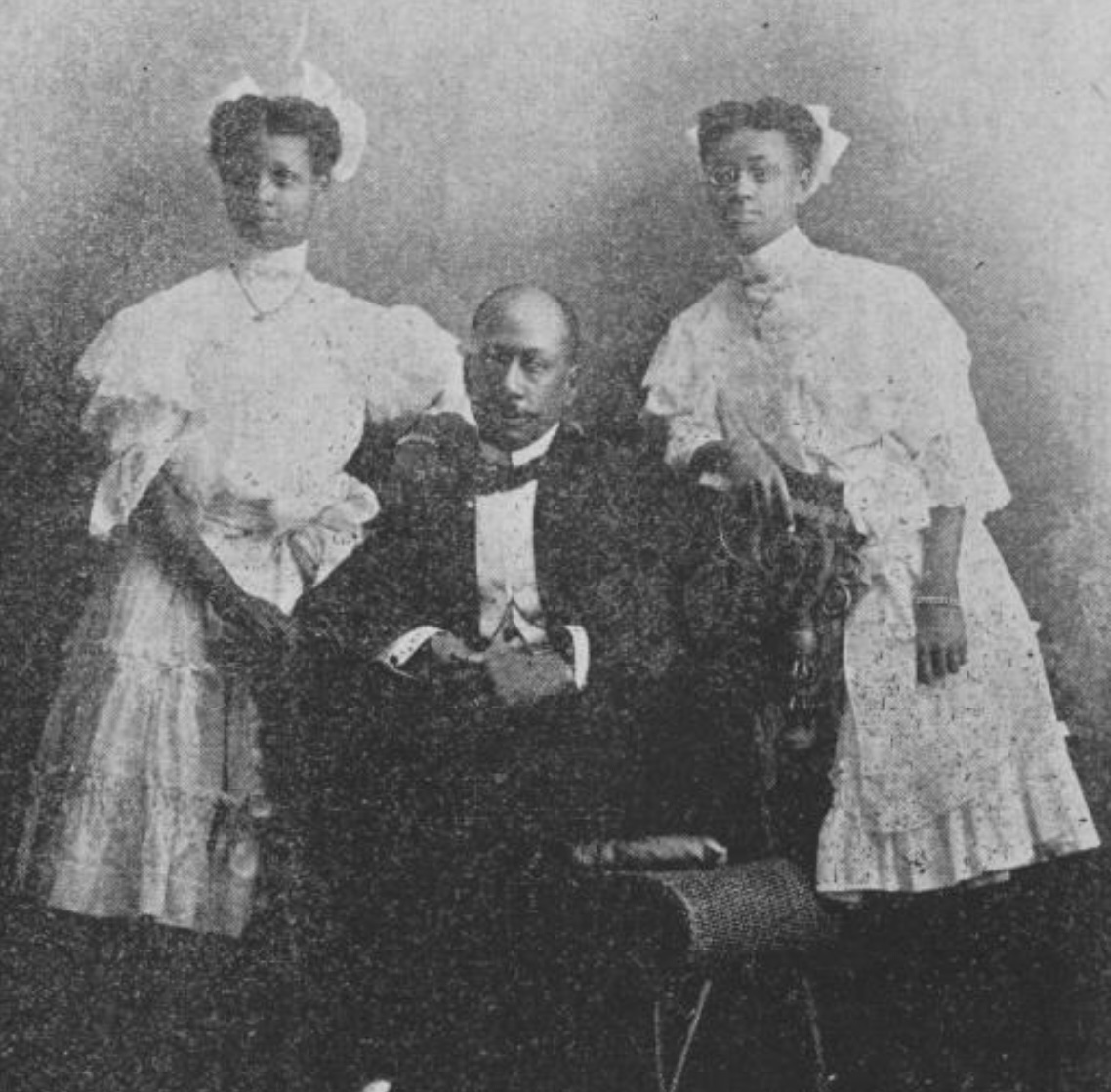
- Martín Morúa Delgado and his daughters, 1907

President of the Senate of Cuba
- In office 18 January 1909 – 4 April 1910
- Preceded by: Ricardo Dolz Arango
- Succeeded by: Antonio Gonzalo Pérez

Personal details
- Born: 11 November 1857
- Died: 28 April 1910 (aged 52)

Martín Morúa Delgado (November 11, 1857–April 28, 1910) was an Afro-Cuban novelist, poet, journalist, translator and statesman who became the first black Senate president in the Republic of Cuba. He served in various positions in the early years of the republic.

== Biography ==
Morúa Delgado was born in Matanzas, Cuba to Ines Delgado, an African-slave mother, and Francisco Morúa, a Spaniard. Morúa Delgado was self-taught in his profession since he was unable to obtain a formal education due to economic demands. Morúa Delgado became an avid reader and was fluent in several languages.

He began his career when he published a newspaper, El Pueblo. The paper criticized slavery and promoted the integration of black people into mainstream Cuban culture. In 1880 Morúa Delgado left Cuba for Key West, Florida where he continued his publishing career on Cuban society and politics. After returning to Cuba, he published his works Sofia and The Unzuazu Family, in which he wrote on how slavery affected Cuban society.

Following Cuba’s independence, Morúa Delgado was elected to the country’s constitutional assembly during the American occupation. In 1901 he became the nation’s first elected Afro-Cuban senator and in 1909 he became the president of the Senate. Morúa Delgado, a member of the Liberal Party, opposed and often spoke out against the Independent Party of Color who he saw as dividing Cuban's based on race. In 1912 the PIC launched an insurgency against the government primarily in the Oriente Province. After weeks of fighting, the National Army successfully ended the rebellion leading to the massacre of thousands of Afro-Cubans.

Morúa Delgado died in 1910 while serving as minister of agriculture.
