= Carlos Machado Morales =

Cuban soldier and politician

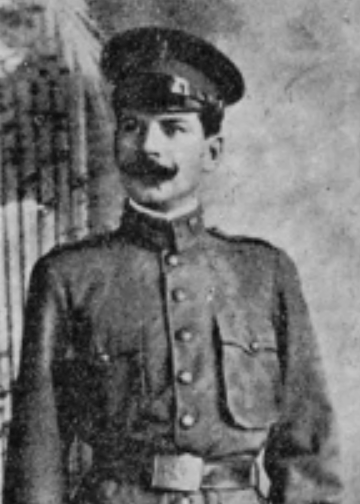

Cuban Senator
- In office ?–1933
- President: Gerardo Machado

Cuban Representative
- In office ?

Personal details
- Born: 1869 (+/-) Las Villas Province, Spanish Cuba
- Died: ?
- Party: Liberal Party of Cuba
- Relations: Gerardo Machado (brother)

Military service
- Allegiance: Republic of Cuba in Arms; Republic of Cuba
- Branch/service: Mambises; Cuban Liberation Army; Chambelonas
- Rank: Colonel
- Battles/wars: Cuban War of Independence; Spanish-American War; Liberal Revolt of 1906; War of 1912; Chambelona War

Carlos Machado y Morales was a Cuban soldier and infantry officer who became the 2nd-most powerful person in Cuba during the reign of the Machado regime, being in control of the Senate and his own newspaper, while his brother was in control of the Presidency. Machado fought with the Mambises and the Cuban Liberation Army for the Republic of Cuba in Arms during the Cuban War of Independence and the Spanish–American War. After the Liberal Revolt of 1906, Machado and his brother Gerardo were both imprisoned in the Prince's Castle. During the War of 1912, he was placed in charge of the 2nd Infantry Regiment and was one of the most prominent military figures in the Oriente Province, placed in charge of the garrison at Guantánamo. After the Cuban elections of 1916, Machado became a Chambelona, and commanded units during the Chambelona War, after which he was arrested for treason. When his brother, Gerardo Machado, became the President of Cuba, Machado soon became the leader of the Liberal Party of Cuba in the Senate of Cuba, representing Las Villas Province. He was also for some time the director of the Cuban newspaper Heraldo de Cuba. Following the collapse of his brother's government after the success of the Cuban General Strike of 1933, Machado was ordered to return to Cuba to face execution by a military tribunal, an order which he disobeyed.
