= 1938 Cuban parliamentary election =

Mid-term parliamentary elections were held in Cuba on 5 March 1938 in order to fill half the seats in the Senate and House of Representatives. The Liberal Party was the biggest winner, taking 25 of the 83 seats in the House. Voter turnout was 44.2%.

== Results ==
=== House of Representatives ===
Party	Seats
Liberal Party of Cuba	25
Democratic National Association	24
Nationalist Union	22
Social-Democratic Party	6
Cuban Popular Party	4
Cuban Unionist Party	2
Total	83
Source: Nohlen
