= Gerardo Machado =

President of Cuba from 1925 to 1933

Gerardo Machado y Morales
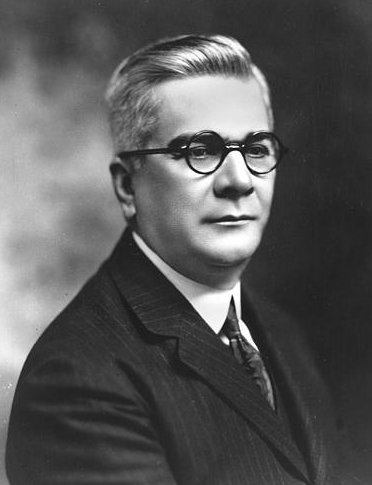

President of the Republic of Cuba
- In office 20 May 1925 – 12 August 1933
- Vice President: Carlos de la Rosa
- Preceded by: Alfredo Zayas
- Succeeded by: Alberto Herrera y Franchi

Personal details
- Born: Gerardo Machado y Morales; 28 September 1871 Camajuaní, Santa Clara, Spanish Cuba
- Died: 29 March 1939 (aged 67) Miami Beach, Florida, United States
- Party: Liberal
- Spouse: Elvira Machado Nodal
- Children: Laudelina (Nena) Machado-Machado; Ángela Elvira Machado-Machado; Berta Machado-Machado

Military service
- Branch/service: Cuban Liberation Army
- Battles/wars: Cuban War of Independence; Spanish-American War; Liberal Revolt of 1906; War of 1912; Chambelona War

Gerardo Machado y Morales (28 September 1871 – 29 March 1939) was a general of the Cuban War of Independence and President of Cuba from 1925 to 1933.

Machado was elected president in 1924 as the leader of the Liberal Party, a moderate reform-oriented party. He entered the presidency with widespread popularity and support from the major political parties. However, his support declined over time and Machado took dictatorial powers. Despite promising to govern only for one term, he ran for re-election in 1928 and won a non-democratic election where the opposition was repressed. As protests and rebellions became more strident, his administration curtailed free speech and imprisoned, exiled, and murdered his opponents.

Ultimately, in 1933, Machado was forced to step down in favor of a provisional government headed by Carlos Manuel de Céspedes y Quesada and brokered by US ambassador Sumner Welles. Machado went into exile in Miami Beach, Florida.

== Family and education ==
Machado was born in 1871 as the oldest child in his family, in the central province of Las Villas (today known as Villa Clara). Machado's father, Gerardo Machado y Castellón, served with Cuban rebels in all three of the major wars of rebellion against Spain. Machado had two younger siblings, a brother named Carlos and a sister named Consuelo. He and his siblings grew up on their family's cattle farm, during the Ten Years' War, where his father attained the rank of major. The war ended without Cuba achieving independence. When he was in his early 20s, Machado engaged in growing and selling tobacco.

As a young man, he married Elvira Machado Nodal (28 October 1868 in Villa Clara – 1968). They had three daughters together: Laudelina (Nena), Ángela Elvira, and Berta.

== Cuban War of Independence ==
In 1895 Cubans launched a War of Independence against Spain. Machado joined the Cuban Liberation Army and rose to the rank of brigadier general. He was one of the youngest Cuban generals in the war. He fought in the middle provinces.

== Post-war career ==
After the war ended, Machado turned to politics and business. In 1902, Cuba was granted full independence. Meanwhile, Machado was elected as mayor of Santa Clara. During the national administration of José Miguel Gómez (1909–1913), Machado was appointed as inspector of the armed forces and later as Secretary of the Interior.

After his return to private life, he engaged in farming and in business, investing in public utilities. With his family provided for, he returned to politics in the early 1920s.

Machado was said to be the party's war leader in Las Villas province, where he fought on the Liberal side in the "Little War of February 1917" La Chambelona (Chambelona War), with José Miguel Gómez, Alfredo Zayas, and Enrique Loynaz del Castillo. The Liberals were defeated. Calixto Enamorado fought on the Conservative side.

After initial victories for the Liberals, things turned for the worse, and yet Machado continued to fight even after the Liberals were defeated by the machine guns of Colonel Rosendo Collazo at Caicaje, once the hacienda of Santiago Saura Orraque and Juan Manuel Perez de la Cruz. Finally they could not continue and Machado surrendered on 8 March 1917.

President Mario García Menocal had definitively won the conflict. Technically there was no U.S. intervention in this war. Cuban Army officers, notably Julio Sanguilí in Santiago, and their forces regained control of the government.

In this war, against the background of the Great War raging in Europe, the Liberals were said to be pro-German. This resulted in U.S. President Woodrow Wilson adding Cuba to his worries, as he was already concerned about the Mexican civil conflict and actions of Pancho Villa on the Southern border. The stress of supervising the American military intervention resulted in the death of Frederick Funston, a friend and ally of Menocal. President Menocal declared war on Germany 7 April 1917.

Machado was appointed as Interior Minister under José Miguel Gómez. Allied with his predecessor, the outgoing president Alfredo Zayas, and running as a Liberal Party candidate in the 1924 election, Machado defeated Mario García Menocal of the Conservative Party by an overwhelming majority; he was elected as Cuba's fifth president. He campaigned with the slogan, "Water, roads, and schools".

== First term as president ==
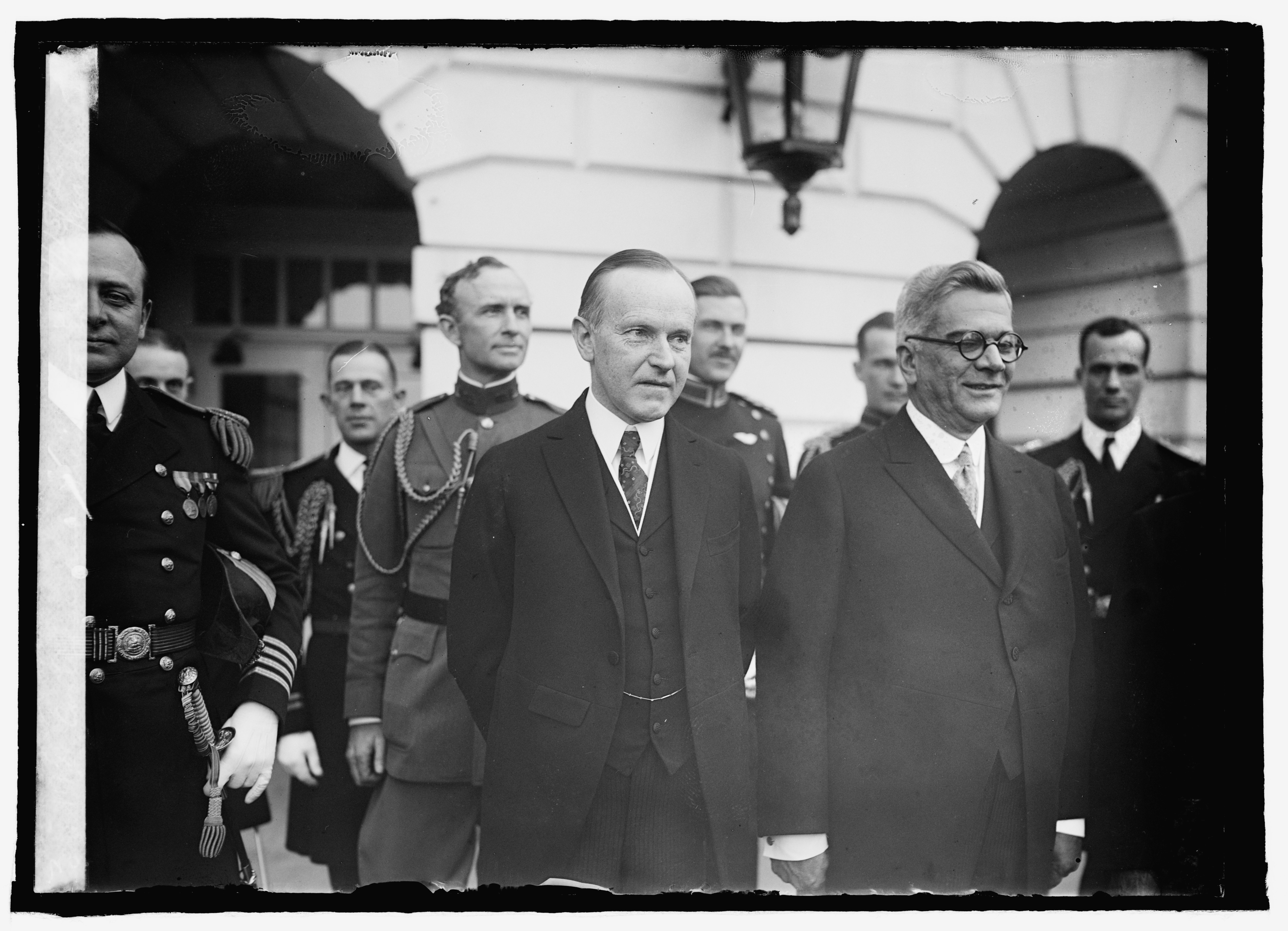
President Calvin Coolidge with Machado in 1925.

Machado took office as President of Cuba on 20 May 1925, and left office on 12 August 1933. He is noted for stating that at the end of his term he would ask for the abrogation of the Platt Amendment. Elected at the time of a fall in world sugar prices, he was a Cuban industrialist and member of the political elite of the Liberal Party. Machado's first term (1925–1929) coincided with a period of prosperity. Sugar production expanded, and the United States provided a close and ready market. Machado embarked on an ambitious public works program. He determined to make Cuba the "Switzerland of the Americas."

In April 1927, Machado visited the United States and on 23 April 1927, he met with President Calvin Coolidge. During his visit, Machado discussed with Coolidge many issues including the Platt Amendment. Whether for the sake of gaining political favour, being tactful or other reasons, Machado stated that the Platt Amendment was in fact a positive benefit to the Cuban people, but he insisted on a modification of its terms as the Platt Amendment was a stigma of embarrassment among the international community since it represented Cuba as lacking complete sovereignty over its affairs.

Among the public works completed during Machado's administration, there was the Carretera Central or Central Highway which ran practically the entire length of the island, from Pinar del Rio in the west to Santiago de Cuba, a distance of over 1,126 kilometres (700 mi). Machado was also responsible for the construction of El Capitolio (The Capitol), the elegant home of the Cuban Congress from 1929 to 1959. The new building, designed by Raúl Otero and Eugenio Rayneri Piedra and constructed in 1926–1929 had a neoclassical design that borrowed elements from the U.S. Capitol building and the Pantheon in Paris. Its purpose was to portray the optimism, confidence and elegance of the new democracy.

Additionally, Machado oversaw the enlargement of the University of Havana, and the expansion of health facilities. Other key buildings constructed under his administration include the Hotel Nacional de Cuba, the Asturia Center (today National Museum of Fine Arts of Havana), the Bacardi Building (Havana), Lopez Serrano and the Hotel Presidente. He also sponsored a tariff reform bill in 1927 providing protection to certain Cuban industries. Despite these accomplishments, Cuba's dependence on sugar continued, and United States influence and investments increased.

In order to complete the financing of these projects, the President, ignoring his original pledge against foreign loans, entered into transactions with the Chase Bank Syndicate resulting by his second term in the increase of Cuba's public debt by $86 million.

== Second term as president ==
=== 1928 re-election ===
Cosme de la Torriente y Peraza, Cuban statesman and President of the League of Nations in the 1920s, said:

In 1925 General Machado succeeded Dr. Zayas as President. Despite his promise not to stand for reelection, Machado sought to have the Constitution of 1901 modified so that he could maintain himself in power. As a result, a widespread state of public disorder became almost permanent. It was under these circumstances that Machado was reelected without opposition in 1928.

According to Peraza on 9 January 1931, the following newspapers were closed upon Machado's presidential decreeː Diario de la Marina, El Mundo, El Pais, Informacion, The Havana American, La Semana, Karikato, Carteles, and Bohemia, followed by the multiple arrests of numerous newspaper editors.

His detractors claimed he became despotic and forced his way into a second term. Throughout his campaign leading to the 1924 general election, Machado stated numerous times that he did not aspire to be reelected, but only two years into his presidency he changed his mind. In 1927 Machado pushed a series of constitutional amendments to enable him to seek re-election, which he obtained in the 1928 presidential election. This act of continuismo, coupled with growing economic depression caused by a decline in sugar prices starting in 1925, its aggravation due to the crash of 1929, and political repression, led to significant political instability. Machado also faced backlash from university students after the formation of the Directorio Estudiantil Universitario in 1927. After various protests and the death of the DEU members, most notably of Rafael Trejo, Machado closed the university in 1930.

U.S. Secretary of State Cordell Hull wrote, in a telegram to the incoming U.S. Ambassador to Cuba Sumner Welles on 1 May 1933, with respect to Machado's constitutional reforms of 1927:

Under the terms of the Cuban Constitution (1901 Constitution of Cuba), as promulgated in 1902, amendments to the Constitution proposed by the Congress did not become effective until approved by a constituent assembly specifically elected for that purpose. Consequently, after the project for constitutional reform had been enacted by the Cuban Congress, elections were held for delegates to the constituent assembly and those delegates were elected a revised form of the so-called "Crowed Electoral Code", the revisions selected, in their great majority, by members of the existing House and Senate, and in most instances the Senators and Representatives themselves served as delegates to the constituent assembly. It is obvious that the revision of the Electoral Code made possible at this time the election of delegates favorable to the proroguing of the terms of the President, of the members of the Senate and of the members of the House of Representatives, and that such delegates were by no means elected through the untrammeled vote of the Cuban people themselves. The constituent assembly so selected convened in the month of April 1928. Under the terms of the then-existing Constitution, the duties of the constituent assembly were "limited either to approving or rejecting the amendment voted by the co-legislative bodies." Notwithstanding this clear provision and the clear intent thereof, the constituent assembly revised completely several of the provisions of the project submitted by the Cuban Congress. It would seem that there was a reasonable measure of doubt that the constituent assembly acted "ultra vires". The Supreme Court of Cuba has, however, consistently refrained from rending a decision upon this question.

=== Violence ===
Machado survived several attempts on his life. In the most famous, a violent opposition group, the ABC (abecedarios), assassinated the President of the Cuban Senate Clemente Vazquez Bello. They had constructed a tunnel to reach the Vazquez family crypt in Havana's Colón Cemetery and planted an explosive device there, anticipating that Machado would attend the funeral. The plan failed when the family decided to bury Vazquez in Santa Clara instead. This attempt is the basis of the 1949 Horizon Pictures film We Were Strangers.

Machado has also been credited for unleashing a wave of violence against his critics. In Machado: Crimenes y Horrores de un Regimen, Carlos G. Peraza details some of Machado's alleged crimes. Peraza blames Machado for the death of numerous Cubans including Armando Andre y Alvarado (1926), Enrique Varona (1926), Claudio Bouzón –Noske Yalob (1928), Ponce de Leon y Perez Terradas (1928), Abelardo Pacheco (1930), Raoul Martin (1931), the three Freyre de Andrade brothers (1932) and most famously Rafael Trejo (30 September 1930).

There were numerous murders and assassinations committed by the police and army under Machado's administration. The extent of his involvement in these is disputed. Writing to the U.S. Secretary of State, on 5 January 1933, U.S. ambassador to Cuba, Harry Frank Guggenheim noted as follows,

Last night I personally called on the [Cuban] Secretary of State in regard to Hernandez and was assured there was no cause for apprehension in this or other cases. Hernandez or Alvarez died shortly after midnight in a hospital to which he had been brought with a bullet in his head. Ferrara [Cuban Secretary of State] this morning explained that he had ascertained last night that no person named Hernandez was under arrest. These killings of prisoners have deeply stirred public opinion and have strengthened belief that no person under arrest is safe from official vengeance.

The following day Harry Frank Guggenheim reported to the U.S. Secretary of Stateː

I saw the President [Machado] this morning. He did not attempt to disclaim Government's responsibility for recent murders of students which he characterized as a stupid mistake.

Writing to the U.S. Secretary of State, on 8 April 1933, The Chargee in Cuba, Edward Reed noted:

according to information obtained by the Embassy from sources believed to be reliable, there were several killings in and near Habana on the night of 6 April... the secret police arrested a young man named Carlos Manuel Fuertes outside of Payret Theatre in Habana. Fuertes is said to have been a member of the student directorate. Later in the night his body was found near the Eremita de las Catalinas on Ayesteran Street.

== Regime change ==
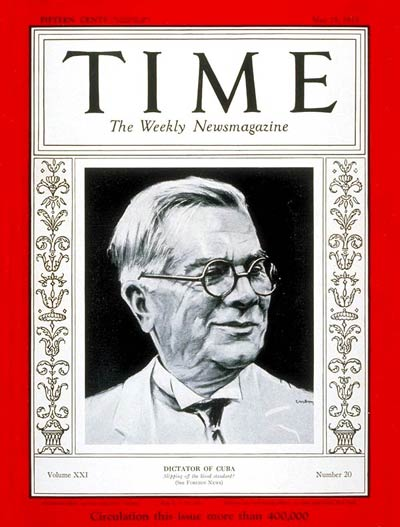
Gerardo Machado, Time, 1933

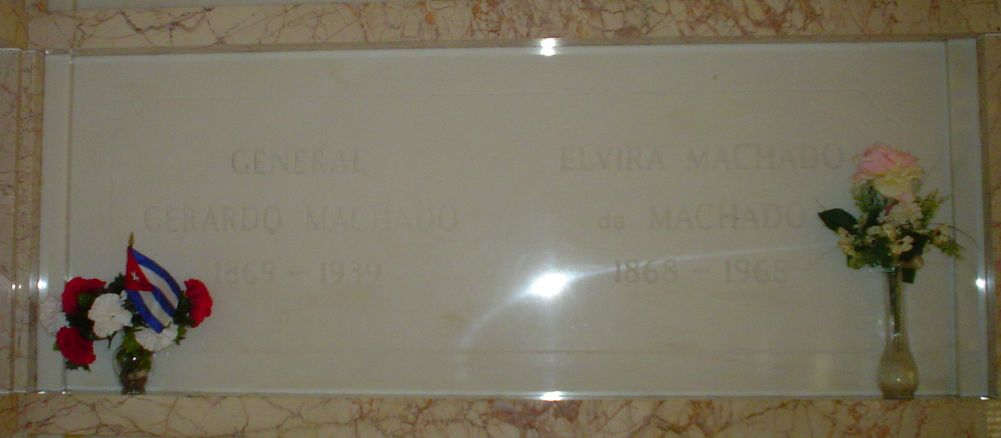
Gerardo & Elvira Machado's crypt

In Cuba, Machado engaged in a long struggle with diverse insurgent groups, from the green shirts of the ABC to Blas Hernández to the conservative veterans of the Cuban War of Independence to the radical Antonio Guiteras group, and he clung on for several years.

In May 1933, newly appointed US ambassador Sumner Welles arrived in Cuba and initiated negotiation with the opposition groups for a government to succeed Machado's. A provisional government headed by Carlos Manuel de Céspedes y Quesada (son of Cuban independence hero Carlos Manuel de Céspedes) and including members of the ABC was brokered; it took power on 13 August 1933 amidst a general strike in Havana. Welles succeeded in weakening Machado's government by extracting a series of concessions which tipped the balance of power in favor of the opposition.

The collapse of Machado's government was followed by the provisional president General Alberto Herrera y Franchi (12-13 August 1933).

The collapse of Machado's government can be traced to the beginning of negotiations between Machado's government and opposition groups with Ambassador Welles as mediator. One of the proposed solutions to the political crisis was the appointment of a vice president who would be impartial and acceptable to all parties, followed by a leave of absence for President Machado until the 1934 general election. This plan would ensure that Machado no longer had power and, most importantly, could not tamper with the 1934 general election, while still keeping within the country's constitutional framework. Eventually, as Machado resisted giving up power and the crisis escalated, the army revolted. Welles noted as follows on 12 August 1933 at 3 a.m.: "Since the abortive revolt of the first battalion of artillery yesterday afternoon there have been several threatened revolts in diverse portions of the Army insisting upon the immediate resignation of President Machado." Machado left Cuba on a flight to the Bahamas on the afternoon of 12 August 1933.

Machado died of colon cancer in Miami Beach, US in 1939 and was entombed in Miami at Woodlawn Park Cemetery and Mausoleum (now Caballero Rivero Woodlawn North Park Cemetery and Mausoleum).

== Bibliography ==
- Cano Vázquez, F. 1953: La Revolución de la Chambelona. Revista Bohemia. La Habana, 1 May 1953. 45 (19) 82–86, 184, 188.
- González, Reynaldo 1978 Nosotros los liberales nos comimos la lechona. Editorial de Ciencias Sociales. Havana
- Waldemar, León Caicaje: Batalla Final de una Revuelta. Bohemia pp. 100–103, 113
- .
- Montaner, Carlos Alberto 1999 Viaje al Corazón de Cuba. Planes and Janés
- Morales y Morales, Vidal 1959 (printed 1962) Sobre la guerra civil de 1917. Documentos del Siglo XX, Boletín del Archivo Nacional. Volume 58 pp. 178–256.
- Parker, William Belmont 1919 Cubans of Today Putnam's Sons, New York,
- Portell Vila, Herminio La Chambelona en Oriente. Bohemia pp. 12–13, 112–125.
- Primelles, L- 1955 Crónica cubana, 1915-1918: La reelección de Menocal y la Revolución de 1917. La danza de los millones – Editorial Lex, Havana.

== Memoirs and papers ==
Machado y Morales, Gerardo (written in 1936 published in 1957 and later) Ocho años de lucha – memorias. Ediciones Universales, Ediciones Historicas Cubanas. Miami ISBN 0-89729-328-2 ISBN 0-89729-328-2

The papers of Gerardo Machado y Morales are available for research online, at the University of Miami. Selected materials from these papers have been digitized and are available elsewhere online.
