= Chappaqua Mountain Institute =

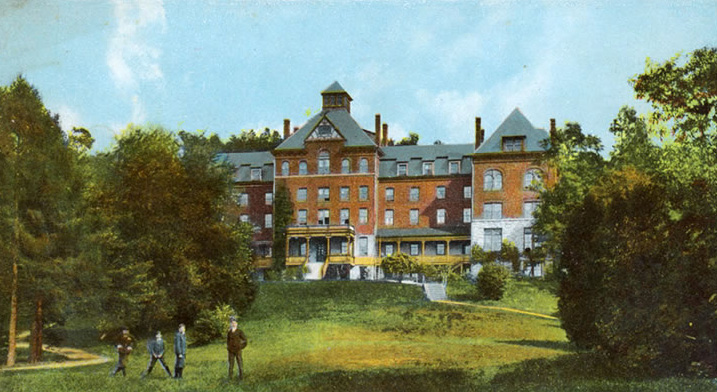
Chappaqua Mountain Institute in 1906

Chappaqua Mountain Institute was a private co-educational college preparatory school in Chappaqua, New York, founded by the Quakers in 1870. The school closed in 1908 and re-opened in Valhalla, New York, where it eventually became a girls-only boarding school. Highly regarded in its day, it was described in a contemporary travel guide as "a seat of Quaker learning". The Institute's alumni included Mario García Menocal, who became the third president of Cuba; copper magnate William Cornell Greene; and songwriter Irving Caesar.

== History ==
When the school was established in 1870, all post-eighth grade education in the area was provided by private academies, a practice which continued until the early 20th century. Although founded and run by a Hicksite Quaker Meeting which had moved to Chappaqua from Purchase, New York, in the 1830s, the school was non-sectarian. Initially, it provided a four-year co-educational program which prepared students for college. Later, an elementary school was added and manual and commercial subjects were also taught as well as music and art. While most of its students were boarders, a fair number of children from the town attended as day students.

The Institute's first building, a large three storey structure with a basement and mansard roof, stood on 40 acres (16 ha) of wooded grounds on the lower slope of Chappaqua Mountain facing Quaker Street. It was built mostly of wood, and in the early hours of February 21, 1885, a defective chimney caused a fire which completely destroyed the building. All 50 of the students and staff sleeping there that night got out of the building unharmed, including young Alfred Farragut, the nephew of Admiral David Farragut, who had a narrow escape. Finding themselves outside in the freezing snow, barefoot and dressed only in their pyjamas, Alfred and two of his friends had gone back to their room to retrieve their clothes, but became trapped there when the staircase caught fire. Eventually the boys used a clothes line to lower themselves from a third storey window.

A new brick, stone and concrete building with an extra storey and two added wings was erected on the site in 1886 and served as the school's home until its closure. Public lectures were also held there, and in the summer of 1894 the school and its grounds served as the home for a conference of the seven North American Quaker Yearly Meetings with many of the 1200 delegates accommodated in tents on the lawns. In 1906, Mary Nichols Cox became the school's first female principal. She had a PhD. in botany from Cornell University and was married to the architect and Quaker historian John Cox Jr. When the school closed in 1908, she became the owner and principal of Grayrock Country Home School in Chappaqua, a co-educational boarding and day school for young children.

=== Post-closure ===
A year after its closure, the Chappaqua Mountain Institute reopened in Valhalla, New York, and by 1916 had become a girls-only boarding school. The building and grounds of the former school in Chappaqua were bought by the Children's Aid Society in 1909 with a large donation from Elizabeth Milbank Anderson and became a convalescent home for children from New York City. The Elizabeth Milbank Anderson Home closed in 1967, although the Children's Aid Society continued to use the grounds as a summer camp. The building remained unoccupied for several years and was eventually demolished following a severe fire.

== Sources ==
- Barbour, Hugh (1995). Quaker Crosscurrents: Three Hundred Years of Friends in the New York Yearly Meetings. Syracuse University Press, ISBN 0-8156-2651-7
- Craig, Warren (1978). Sweet and Lowdown: America's Popular Songwriters. Scarecrow Press. ISBN 0-8108-1089-1
- Harrison, Mitchell Charles (1902). Prominent and Progressive Americans: An Encyclopædia of Contemporaneous Biography. New York: New York Tribune
- New York Central and Hudson River Railroad Company (1895). Health and pleasure on "America's greatest railroad.". New York: American Bank Note Company
- The New York Times ( February 22, 1885). "Driven out by the Fire, The Quaker Schoolhouse at Chappaqua Burned"
- The New York Times (August 5, 1894). "Quaker Gray at Chappaqua"
- Sargent, Porter E. (1916). Handbook of American Private Schools. Boston: George H. Ellis Co.
- Tucker, Spencer (2009). "Menocal, Mario García", The Encyclopedia of the Spanish-American and Philippine-American Wars: A Political, Social, and Military History, Volume 1, pp. 394–395. ABC-CLIO, ISBN 1-85109-951-4
- Westchester County Archives. Images of Chappaqua Mountain Institute, 1870-1909
- Williams, Gray (2006). New Castle: Chappaqua and Millwood, Images of America. Arcadia Publishing. ISBN 0-7385-3928-7
