= 1916 Cuban general election =

- 1 November 1916
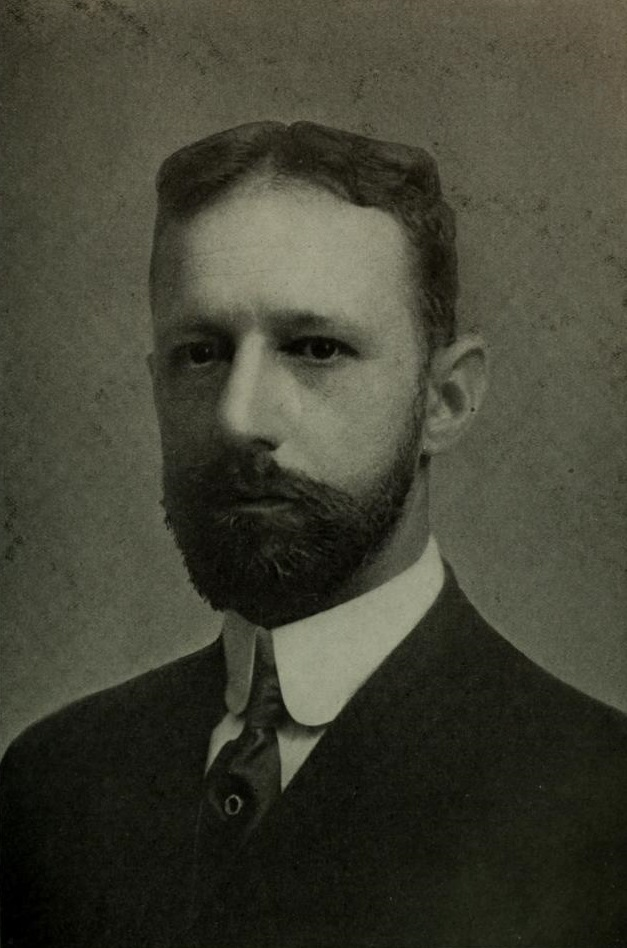

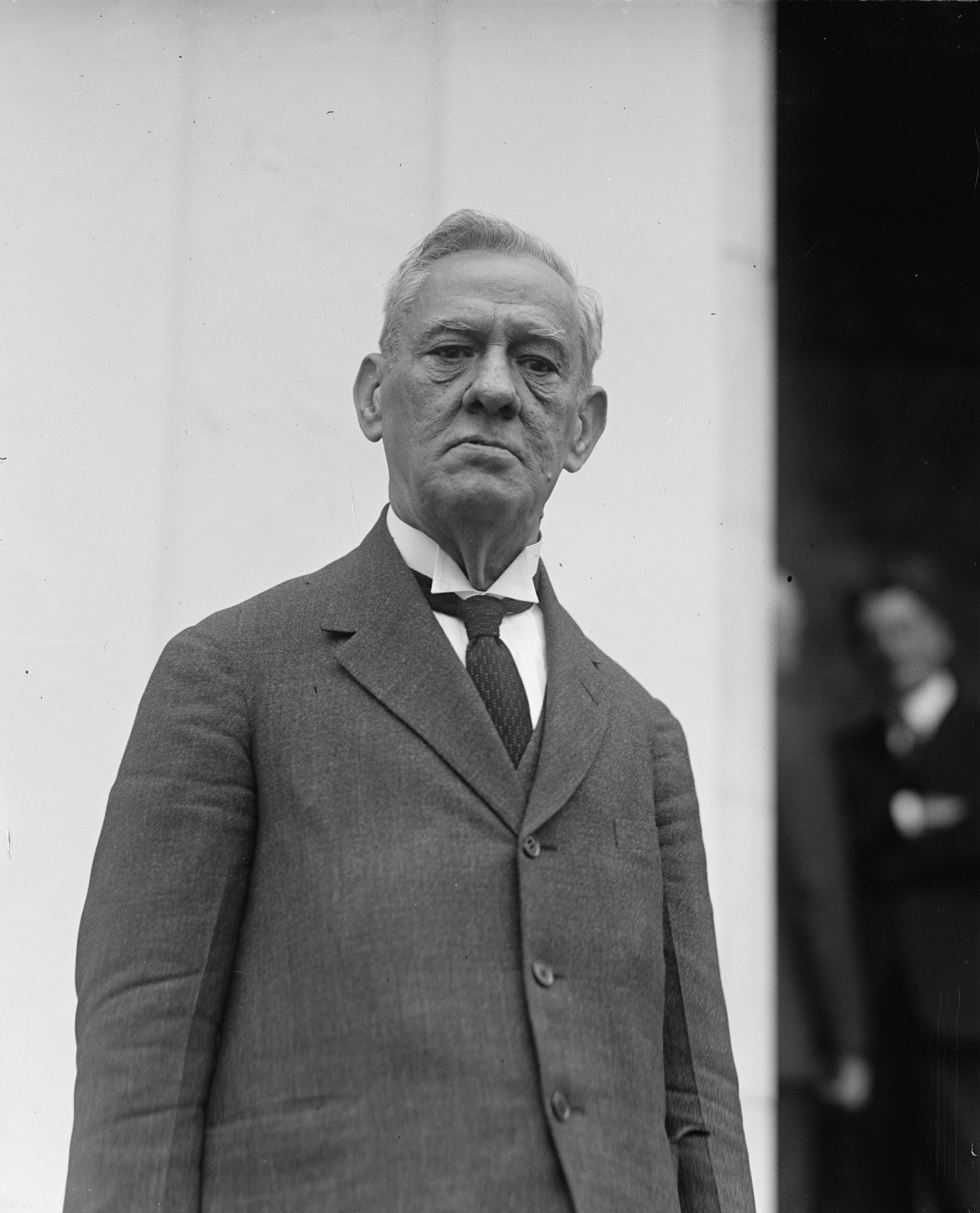
Nominee	Mario García Menocal	Alfredo Zayas y Alfonso
Party	PNC	Liberal
President before election
Mario García Menocal
PNC
Elected President
Mario García Menocal
PNC

General elections were held in Cuba on 1 November 1916. Mario García Menocal was re-elected in the presidential election, whilst the National Conservative Party and the Liberal Party both won 27 seats in the House of Representatives.

== Results ==
Of the population of 2.6 million, only 796,636 – less than a third – were registered to vote. Of these 353,002 voted in the elections, a voter turnout of 44.31%.

=== Senate ===
Party	Seats
National Conservative Party	8
Liberal Party of Cuba	4
Total	12
Source: Nohlen

=== House of Representatives ===
Party	Seats
National Conservative Party	27
Liberal Party of Cuba	27
Unionist Liberal Party	4
Provincial Liberal Party	2
Total	60
Source: Nohlen
