= Neutrality Act =

Neutrality Act may refer to:

- Proclamation of Neutrality, 1793, declared the US neutral in the conflict between France and Great Britain
- Neutrality Act of 1794, makes it illegal for an American to wage war against any country at peace with the US
- Neutrality Act of 1818
- Neutrality Acts of the 1930s, passed by Congress in the 1930s in response to turmoil in Europe and Asia
