= Cuban Popular Party =

Cuban Popular Party Partido Popular Cubano
- Abbreviation: PPC

The Cuban Popular Party (Spanish: Partido Popular Cubano, PPC) was a political party in Cuba that contested elections between 1920 and 1938. In the 1932 Cuban parliamentary election, the party won six of 69 seats contested in the House of Representatives.
