= Mario García Menocal =

3rd President of Cuba (1913-1921)

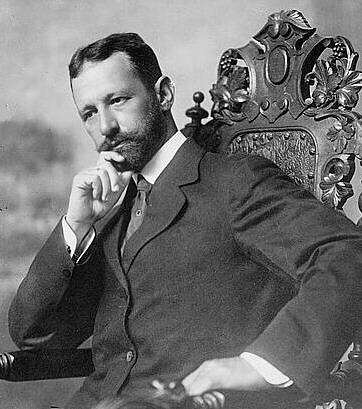
- Menocal, c. 1912

3rd President of Cuba
- In office 20 May 1913 – 20 May 1921
- Vice President: Enrique José Varona and Emilio Núñez
- Preceded by: José Miguel Gómez
- Succeeded by: Alfredo Zayas

Personal details
- Born: December 17, 1866 Jagüey Grande, Captaincy General of Cuba
- Died: September 7, 1941 (aged 74) Havana, Republic of Cuba
- Party: Conservative Party
- Spouse: Mariana Seva y Rodríguez
- Children: 3
- Relatives: Patrizia De Blanck (first cousin twice removed)
- Education: Chappaqua Mountain Institute
- Alma mater: Maryland State College of Agriculture; Cornell University
- Occupation: Military engineer; civil engineer; politician

Aurelio Mario Gabriel Francisco García Menocal y Deop (December 17, 1866 – September 7, 1941) was the 3rd President of Cuba, serving from 1913 to 1921. His term as president saw Cuba's participation in the Allies in World War I.

== Early life and education ==
Menocal was born on December 17, 1866, in Jagüey Grande, in Spanish-administered Cuba. At 13-years-old, he was sent to boarding schools in the United States, where he attended Chappaqua Mountain Institute in Chappaqua, New York and then Maryland State College of Agriculture, which was later renamed the University of Maryland, College Park in College Park, Maryland.

In 1884, he was accepted to Cornell University, where he graduated as civil engineer from the Cornell University College of Engineering in 1888. While at Cornell University, he was a member of the Delta Chi chapter of Delta Kappa Epsilon fraternity.

== Career ==
As a young man, he was involved in the Cuban War of Independence, which sought Cuba's independence from Spain. When Cuba received independence following the Spanish–American War, García Menocal became a leading conservative politician.

== President of Cuba ==
=== First term (1913–1917) ===
Menocal was elected president in 1912, and became known for his strong support of business and corporations. In late July 1914, the alliance the National Conservative Party (Cuba) had with a branch of the Liberal Party of Cuba was broken resulting in Menocal losing control of the Cuban Congress.

On May 19, 1915, editor of newspaper La Tribuna, Enrique Mazas, was arrested on charges of libel against President Menocal. It is claimed that Mazas wrote an article against President Menocal demanding that he resign either from his position as President of Cuba or General Inspector of the Chappara Sugar Company. In essence, Mazas accused Menocal of using public funds to cover his travel expenses whenever he visited the Chaparra sugar mill (presently in Las Tunas Province) as inspector of the sugar mill.

On September 20, 1916, President Menocal established the Cuban Naval Academy situated at the time in Castillo de Rubens near the Mariel harbour.

On November 1, 1916, President Menocal was re-elected during the 1916 Cuban general election. The elections were highly disputed with many, including scholars such as Gerardo Castellanos, claiming they were outright fraudulent. Political infighting following the highly disputed elections resulted in civil strife and rebellion. On February 11, 1917, Commander Luis Solano rose up against Menocal, whereas the supreme chief of this rebellion was former President José Miguel Gómez. The rebellion proved unsuccessful largely as a result of internal divisions within the ranks, and the support provided to Menocal by then U.S. ambassador, William Elliot Gonzalez. Menocal followed suit in suppressing various newspapers associating with the Liberal Party of Cuba such as Heraldo de Cuba, La Nacion and La Prensa.

In perhaps his most notable action, Menocal authorized Cuba's declaration of war against the German Empire on April 7, 1917, entering World War I a day after the United States. This was believed by many to be an attempt to get the United States to give more support to his government. In December, war was also declared against Austria-Hungary.

=== Second Term (1917–1921) ===
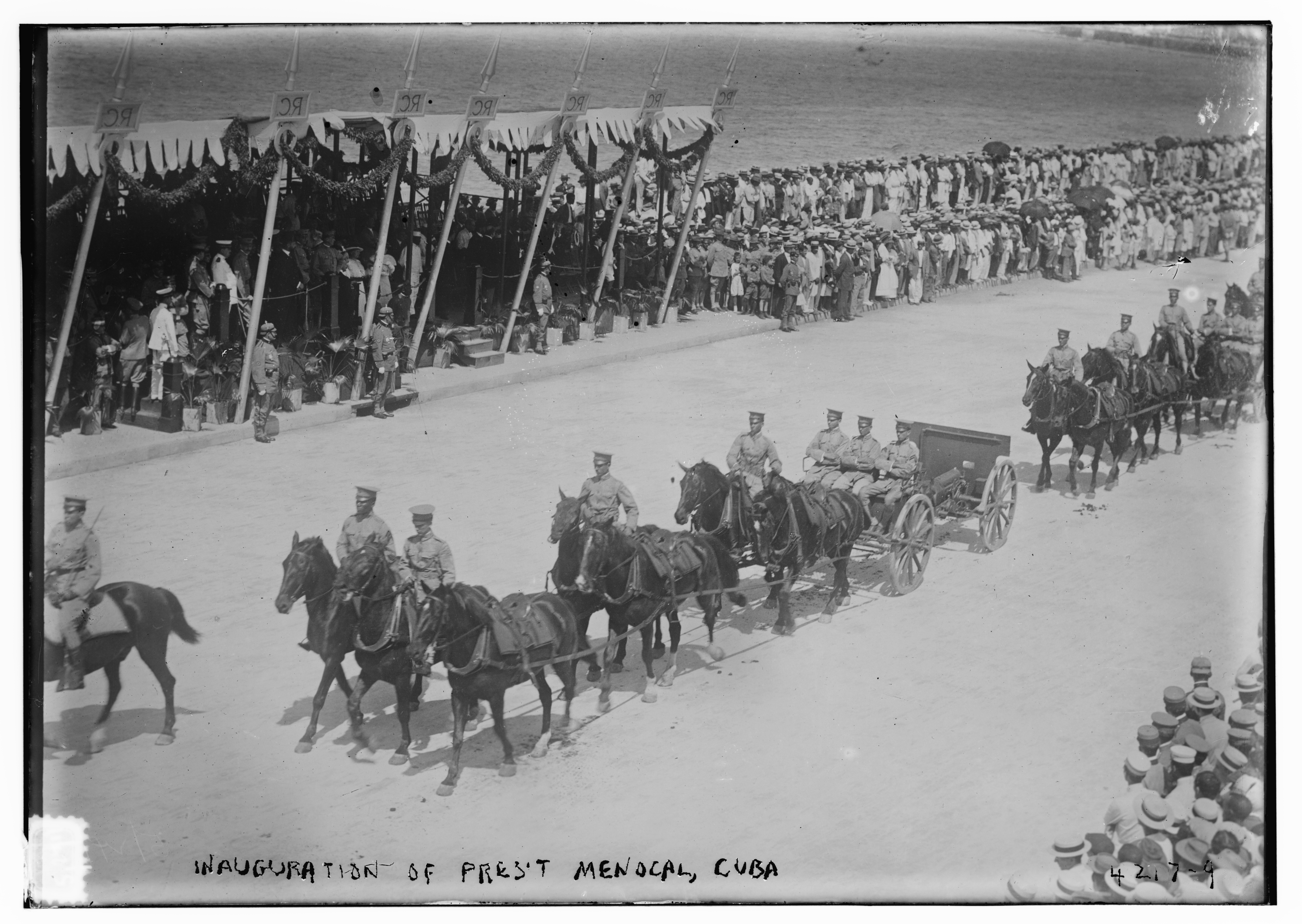
Menocal's second inauguration as president of Cuba in 1917

By mid-June 1917, the rebellion, led by José Miguel Gómez and other Cuban army officers had mostly been quashed In July 1917, Menocal suspended certain constitutional guarantees and called an extra session of Congress.

Constitutional guarantees were only restored more than one year later on August 14, 1918, by another presidential decree following a proclamation by Menocal.

While in office, García Menocal hosted the 1920 Delta Kappa Epsilon National Convention, the first international fraternity conference outside the U.S., which took place in Cuba. Private trains were hired from New England to Florida where the invited men and their families could travel in comfort and style, and upon arrival in Cuba, each man was gifted a gold-trimmed box of cigars. Menocal's hospitality is still remembered in the fraternity to this day. He was responsible for creating the Cuban Peso; until his presidency Cuba used both the Spanish Real and US Dollar.

According to Gerardo Castellanos, President Menocal left the Cuban national treasury in overdraft and therefore in precarious financial situation. Menocal supposedly spent $800 million during his 8 years in office and left a floating debt of $40 million.

== Post-presidency career ==
After his presidency, García Menocal continued to be involved in politics, running for president again in 1924. He attempted a revolution in 1931 and went into exile in the United States when it failed. After less than five years, he returned to Cuba and ran for president a final time in 1936.

== Death ==
On September 7, 1941, Menocal died in Havana, Cuba, at age 74.

== Family ==
García Menocal was married to Mariana Seva y Rodríguez and they had three children, Mario (who married Hortensia Almagro), Raúl (who married Perlita Fowler) and Georgina García Menocal y Seva (who married Eugenio Sardina).

== Sources ==
- Argote-Freyre, Frank (2006). Fulgencio Batista: From Revolutionary to Strongman. New Brunswick, New Jersey: Rutgers University Press. ISBN 978-0-8135-3701-6. OCLC 59223855.
- Fogle, Homer William Jr. (25 Nov 2005). The Deke House at Cornell: A Concise History of the Delta Chi chapter of Delta Kappa Epsilon, 1870–1930. Cf. pp. 27, 57, 60, 64, 66–69. Retrieved 2010-12-02.
- Minot, John Clair (February 1921). "The Convention in Havana", Delta Kappa Epsilon Quarterly, XXXIX, 1, p. 1–25.
- Otero, Juan Joaquin (1954). Libro De Cuba, Una Enciclopedia Ilustrada Que Abarca Las Artes, Las Letras, Las Ciencias, La Economia, La Politica, La Historia, La Docencia, Y ElProgreso General De La Nacion Cubana - Edicion Conmemorative del Cincuentenario de la Republica de Cuba, 1902-1952 (in Spanish).
