= Liberal Party of Cuba =

Liberal Party of Cuba Partido Liberal de Cuba
- Leader: José Miguel Gómez; Gerardo Machado
- Founded: 1878
- Dissolved: 1 January 1959
- Succeeded by: National Liberal Party (not legal successor)
- Headquarters: Havana
- Ideology: Autonomism; Classical liberalism
- Political position: Centre to centre-right
- International affiliation: Liberal International (1947–52)

The Liberal Party of Cuba (Spanish: Partido Liberal de Cuba), was one of the major political parties in Cuba from 1910 until the Cuban Revolution in the late 1950s, when it was exiled.

== History ==
=== Liberal governments ===
Founded as the Autonomist Liberal Party (Spanish: Partido Liberal Autonomista, PLA), in 1878 and renamed in 1898, the party first contested elections in 1910, when it won 23 of the 41 seats in mid-term elections. They lost the 1912 elections to the Conjunción Patriótica alliance, and went on to finish second in elections in 1914, 1916 (in which they won the same number of seats in the House of Representatives as the National Conservative Party, but won fewer seats in the Senate) and 1918.

In the 1920 elections, the Liberal Party's Alfredo Zayas y Alfonso won the presidential election, although the party lost the parliamentary elections to the National League. They went on to win the mid-term elections in 1922. For the 1924 elections the party formed an alliance with the Cuban Popular Party. The alliance's Gerardo Machado won the presidential election, while it also won both the Senate and House elections.

In 1928 elections for a Constitutional Assembly were held, in which the party won 29 of the 55 seats. The party also won the mid-term elections in 1930 and 1932. For the 1936 general election the party was part of the Tripartite Coalition, alongside the Nationalist Union and Republican Action, which won both the presidential election (with Miguel Mariano Gómez as its candidate) and the parliamentary elections. The Liberal Party went on to win the 1938 mid-term elections.

=== Liberal Party's fall ===
In the 1940 general elections the party was again part of an alliance, the People's Socialist Coalition, alongside the Communist Revolutionary Union, Progressive Action, the Democratic National Association and the Republican Democratic Party. The alliance's Fulgencio Batista won the presidential election, whilst the Liberal Party finished second in the House of Representatives elections. The party won 21 seats in the 1942 mid-term elections, matched by the Democratic Party.

The 1944 general election saw the party finish second in the House of Representative elections, with a similar performance in the 1946 mid-term elections. For the 1948 general election the party put forward a joint candidate with the Democratic Party, but lost to the Auténtico-Republican's Carlos Prío Socarrás. The party also finished second in the parliamentary elections.

An alliance with the Democratic Party and the Partido Auténtico won the 1950 mid-term elections. However, for the 1954 elections the party allied against the Partido Auténtico alongside Progressive Action, the Radical Union and the Republican Democratic Party, putting forward the victorious Batista as their presidential candidate. The Liberal Party finished second in the House elections behind Progressive Action.

== Successor ==
The modern party, named National Liberal Party of Cuba, was founded in 2004. It is a member of Liberal International.

== See also ==
- Liberalism in Cuba
