= National Conservative Party (Cuba) =

National Conservative Party Partido Conservador Nacional
- Abbreviation: PCN
- Founded: 1902
- Dissolved: March 1952
- Ideology: Conservatism; Patriotism; Cuban nationalism
- Political position: Centre-right to right-wing

The National Conservative Party (abbr. PCN) was a political party in Cuba. Between 1908 and 1932, the party participated in the national elections; in the 1932 Cuban parliamentary election, the party won 25 of 69 seats.
