= Congress of Cuba =

Legislature of Cuba from 1902 to 1959

Congress of the Republic of Cuba Congreso de la República de Cuba
- Coat of arms of Cuba

Type
- Type: Bicameral
- Houses: Senate; Chamber of Representatives

History
- Founded: May 20, 1902
- Disbanded: 1959
- Preceded by: U.S. Military Government of Cuba
- Succeeded by: National Assembly of People's Power (later, 1976)

Elections
- Last Senate election: 1958 Cuban general election
- Last Chamber of Representatives election: 1958 Cuban general election

Meeting place
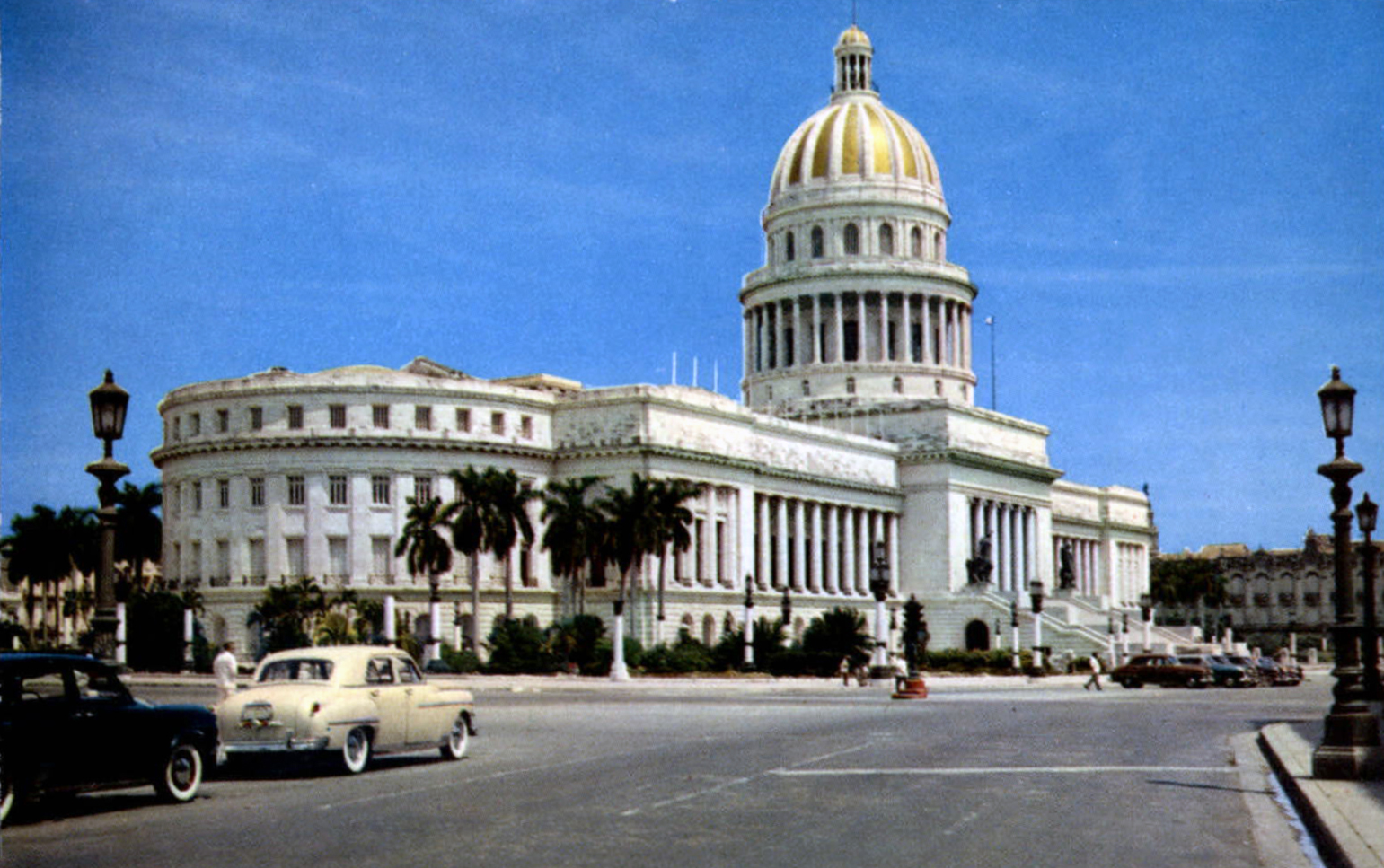
- El Capitolio, Havana

Constitution
- 1901 Constitution; 1940 Constitution

The Congress of Cuba (Spanish: Congreso de Cuba) was the legislature of Cuba from 20 May 1902 until the Cuban Revolution of 1959.

The Congress consisted of the 130-member Chamber of Representatives (Cámara de Representantes) and the 54-member Senate (Senado) in December 1958.

The first Cuban Congress met for the first time on May 5, 1902. Generally, Congress held at least two sessions during a given year. Meetings were interrupted by the Second Occupation of Cuba after the session of September 28, 1906. Following the re-establishment of Cuban-based government in 1909 it met without interruption from January 13, 1909, until April 1933, a few months before President Gerardo Machado was overthrown. During the presidency of Ramon Grau the country's legislative apparatus was largely undertaken by Grau's administration under the auspices of the student revolutionary junta. Commencing with the provisional presidency of Carlos Mendieta a Consejo de Estado (Council of State) undertook advisory legislative functions. The Council of State was abolished in April, 1936 when the Cuban Congress finally resumed its session after three years of inactivity.

== Presidents of the Senate 1902–1958 ==
Name	Took office	Left office	Notes
Domingo Méndez Capote	8 May 1902	5 April 1905	
Manuel Sanguily Garritte	5 April 1905	11 April 1906	
Ricardo Dolz Arango	11 April 1906	28 September 1906	
Martín Morúa Delgado	18 January 1909	4 April 1910	
Antonio Gonzalo Pérez	4 April 1910	16 April 1913	
Eugenio Sánchez Agramonte	16 April 1913	10 April 1917	
Ricardo Dolz Arango	10 April 1917	20 April 1921	
Aurelio Álvarez de la Vega	20 April 1921	7 April 1925	
Clemente Vázquez Bello	7 April 1925	28 September 1932	
Alberto Barrera Fernández	30 September 1932	12 August 1933	
Justo Luis Pozo del Puerto	13 April 1936	1 September 1936	
Arturo Illas Horroutinier	1 September 1936	1 June 1937	
Lucilo de la Peña Cruz	1 June 1937	15 November 1937	
Guillermo Alonso Pujol	15 November 1937	7 September 1938	
Santiago Verdeja Neyra	7 September 1938	21 November 1940	
Antonio Beruff Mendieta	21 November 1940	17 February 1942	
Guillermo Alonso Pujol	17 February 1942	30 August 1943	
José E. Bringuier Laredo	30 August 1943	26 September 1944	
Eduardo Suárez Rivas	26 September 1944	12 December 1945	
Miguel A. Suárez Fernández	12 December 1945	6 October 1950	
Manuel A. Varona Loredo	6 October 1950	10 March 1952	
Anselmo Alliegro Milá	28 January 1955	5 January 1959	

== Presidents of the Chamber of Representatives 1902–1958 ==
Name	Took office	Left office	Notes
Pelayo García Santiago	14 May 1902	3 November 1902	
Rafael Portuondo y Tamayo	18 November 1902	7 November 1903	
Carlos de la Torre Huerta	7 November 1903	4 April 1904	
José A. Malberty	8 July 1904	7 November 1904	
Santiago García Cañizares	9 November 1904	23 April 1906	
Fernando Freyre de Andrade	24 April 1906	12 October 1906	
Orestes Ferrara Marino	18 April 1909	1914	
José Antonio González Lanuza	1914	1914	
Ibrahim Urquiaga Arrastía	30 August 1914	1915	
Orestes Ferrara y Marino	19 April 1915	1917	
Miguel Coyula Llaguno	7 April 1917	1919	
Santiago Verdeja Neyra	1919	1923	
Clemente Vázquez Bello	1923	1925	
Ramón Zaydín	11 April 1925	4 April 1927	
Rafael Guas Inclán	11 April 1927	24 August 1933	
Carlos Márquez Sterling	27 April 1936	3 February 1937	
Antonio Martínez Fraga	4 February 1937	18 April 1938	
Antonio Bravo Acosta	1937	?	
Marcelino Garriga Garay	2 September 1938	1 April 1940	
José A. Cardet Góngora	24 June 1940	16 September 1940	
Gustavo Gutiérrez Sánchez	21 November 1940	27 October 1941	
Carlos Márquez Sterling	29 October 1941	19 October 1942	
Néstor Carbonell Andricaín	19 October 1942	27 September 1944	
Miguel A. de León Fuentes	27 September 1944	1 October 1946	
Rubén de León García	1 October 1946	19 September 1948	
Lincoln Rodón Alvarez	4 October 1948	10 March 1952	
Gastón Godoy y Loret de Mola	28 January 1955	5 January 1959	

== See also ==
- National Assembly of People's Power – Unicameral legislature since 1976
- History of Cuba
