= Minister of Foreign Affairs (Cuba) =

Cabinet minister in the government

The Minister of Foreign Affairs of the Republic of Cuba (Spanish: Ministro de Asuntos Exteriores de la República de Cuba) is a cabinet minister in charge of the Ministry of Foreign Affairs of Cuba, responsible for conducting foreign relations of the country.

== List ==
The following is a list of foreign ministers of Cuba since 1933:

No.	Name (Birth–Death)	Portrait	Tenure
1	Carlos Saladrigas Zayas (1900–1956)		1933
2	Manuel Márquez Sterling (1872–1934)		1933–1934
3	Cosme de la Torriente y Peraza (1872–1956)		1934–1935
4	José Agripino Barnet (1864–1945)		1935
5	Jorge Luis Echarte (1891–1979)		1935–1936
6	José Manuel Cortina (1880–1970)		1936–1937
7	Juan José Remos y Rubio (1896–1969)		1937–1939
8	Miguel Ángel de la Campa y Caraveda (1882–1965)		1939–1940
(6)	José Manuel Cortina (1880–1970)		1940–1942
9	José Agustín Martínez (1880–?)		1942–1943
10	Emeterio Santovenia (1889–1968)		1943–1944
11	Jorge Mañach (1898–1961)		1944
(9)	José Agustín Martínez (1880–?)		1944–1945
12	Gustavo Cuervo Rubio (1890–1978)		1945
13	Alberto Inocente Álvarez (1905–1985)		1945–1947
14	Rafael González Muñoz		1947–1948
—	Carlos Hevia (1900–1964) Acting Minister		1948–1950
15	Ernesto Dihigo (1896–1991)		1950–1951
16	Miguel A. Suárez Fernández (1903–1968)		1951
17	Óscar Gans (1903–1965)		1951
18	Aureliano Sánchez Arango (1907–1976)		1951–1952
(8)	Miguel Ángel de la Campa y Caraveda (1882–1965)		1952–1954
19	Andrés Domingo y Morales del Castillo (1892–1979)		1954–1955
(1)	Carlos Saladrigas Zayas (1900–1956)		1955–1956
20	Gonzalo Güell (1895–1985)		1956–1959
21	Roberto Agramonte (1904–1995)		1959
22	Raúl Roa García (1909–1982)		1959–1976
23	Isidoro Malmierca Peoli (1930–2001)		1976–1992
24	Ricardo Alarcón (1937–2022)		1992–1993
25	Roberto Robaina González (b. 1956)		1993–1999
26	Felipe Pérez Roque (b. 1965)		1999–2009
27	Bruno Rodríguez Parrilla (b. 1958)		2009–present

== See also ==
- Cabinet of Cuba
- List of current foreign ministers
- List of current permanent representatives to the United Nations
