= Embassy of Cuba, Washington, D.C. =

Cuban diplomatic mission in the capital of the United States

Cuban Embassy in Washington, D.C.
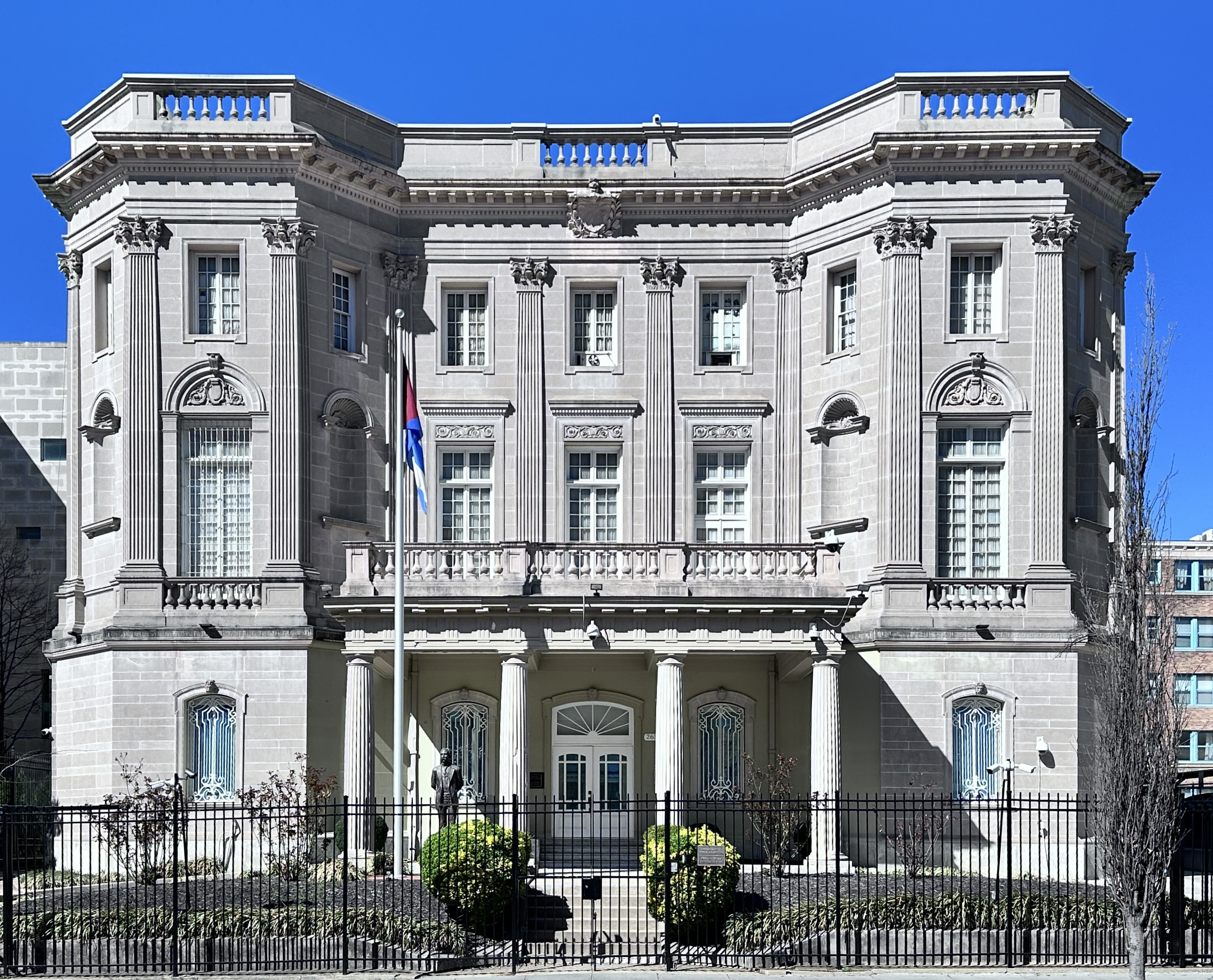
- The Embassy of Cuba in 2025
- Location: 2630 16th Street NW; Washington, D.C., U.S.
- Coordinates: 38.9242°N 77.037°W
- Chargé d'affaires: Lianys Torres Rivera

The Cuban Embassy in Washington, D.C. is the diplomatic mission of Cuba to the United States. It is located at 2630 16th Street Northwest, in the Meridian Hill neighborhood. The building was originally constructed in 1917 as the Cuban embassy, and served in that capacity until the United States severed relations with Cuba in 1961. On July 1, 2015, U.S. President Barack Obama announced the formal restoration of diplomatic relations between the United States and Cuba. The building resumed its role as the Cuban Embassy on July 20, 2015. The U.S. government waived ambassadorial representation, opting for a chargé d'affaires as its diplomatic envoy.

== History ==
From 1977 to 2015, the former Cuban Embassy housed the Cuban Interests Section in the United States. The interests section was staffed by Cubans and operated independently, but it was formally a section of the protecting power's embassy. From 1977 to 1991, it operated as the Cuba Interests Section of the Czechoslovak Embassy to the United States. In 1991, the post-Communist government of Czechoslovakia refused to continue its sponsorship of Cuba. From 1991 to 2015, the Cuban Interests Section operated under the Swiss Embassy, until diplomatic relations were re-established and the building resumed its role as the Cuban embassy.

On May 19, 1979, the now-defunct anti-Castro Cuban group Omega 7 detonated a bomb in the building, which did more damage to the Lithuanian legation next door.

On April 30, 2020, a gunman opened fire at the building with an AK-47 style rifle. No one was injured, and the gunman, a 42-year-old man from Aubrey, Texas, was arrested. Though the gunman's motivation was not officially known, a police report called it a "suspected hate crime".

Two Molotov cocktails were thrown at the embassy in September 2023, causing no injuries or significant damage.

== List of representatives ==
Name	Title	Credentials presented	Head of State
16 June 1902: Legation opened
Gonzalo de Quesada	Envoy Extraordinary and Minister Plenipotentiary	June 16, 1902	Tomás Estrada Palma
General Carlos Garcia Velez	Envoy Extraordinary and Minister Plenipotentiary	April 9, 1909	José Miguel Gómez
Dr. Francisco Carrera Justiz	Envoy Extraordinary and Minister Plenipotentiary	April 8, 1910	José Miguel Gómez
Antonio Martin-Rivero	Envoy Extraordinary and Minister Plenipotentiary	April 11, 1911	José Miguel Gómez
Dr. Pablo Desvernine	Envoy Extraordinary and Minister Plenipotentiary	June 17, 1913	Mario García Menocal
Dr. Carlos Manuel de Cespedes y Quesada	Envoy Extraordinary and Minister Plenipotentiary	July 22, 1914	Mario García Menocal
13 December 1923: Legation raised to Embassy
Cosme de la Torriente y Peraza	Ambassador Extraordinary and Plenipotentiary	December 13, 1923	Alfredo Zayas y Alfonso
Rafael Sanchez-Aballi	Ambassador Extraordinary and Plenipotentiary	December 3, 1925	Gerardo Machado
Orestes Ferrara	Ambassador Extraordinary and Plenipotentiary	December 21, 1926	Gerardo Machado
Oscar B. Cintas	Ambassador Extraordinary and Plenipotentiary	November 4, 1932	Gerardo Machado
Dr. Jose T. Baron	Chargé d'Affaires (a.i.)	August 10, 1933	Gerardo Machado
Dr. Manuel Marquez Sterling	Ambassador Extraordinary and Plenipotentiary	January 31, 1934	Carlos Mendieta
Dr. Jose T. Baron	Chargé d'Affaires (a.i.)	December 10, 1934	Carlos Mendieta
Dr. Guillermo Patterson de Jauregui	Ambassador Extraordinary and Plenipotentiary	February 6, 1935	Carlos Mendieta
Dr. Pedro Martinez Fraga	Ambassador Extraordinary and Plenipotentiary	March 9, 1937	Federico Laredo Brú
Dr. Jose T. Baron	Chargé d'Affaires (a.i.)	December 10, 1940	Fulgencio Batista
Dr. Aurelio Fernandez Concheso	Ambassador Extraordinary and Plenipotentiary	February 5, 1941	Fulgencio Batista
Dr. Guillermo Belt	Ambassador Extraordinary and Plenipotentiary	December 20, 1944	Ramón Grau
Dr. Oscar Gans	Ambassador Extraordinary and Plenipotentiary	April 12, 1949	Carlos Prío Socarrás
Dr. Luis Machado	Ambassador Extraordinary and Plenipotentiary	July 11, 1950	Carlos Prío Socarrás
10 March — 27 March 1952: Relations severed
Dr. Alberto Espinosa	Chargé d'Affaires (a.i.)	March 27, 1952	Fulgencio Batista
Dr. Aurelio Fernandez Concheso	Ambassador Extraordinary and Plenipotentiary	April 28, 1952	Fulgencio Batista
Dr. Miguel Ángel de la Campa y Caraveda	Ambassador Extraordinary and Plenipotentiary	April 8, 1955	Fulgencio Batista
Nicolas Arroyo	Ambassador Extraordinary and Plenipotentiary	April 9, 1958	Fulgencio Batista
Dr. Ernesto Dihigo	Ambassador Extraordinary and Plenipotentiary	February 25, 1959	Manuel Urrutia Lleó
3 January 1961: Relations severed (Note: The U.S. and Cuba did not have bilateral diplomatic relations between 1961 and 2015. During this period, the U.S. diplomatic mission in Cuba operated under the auspices of the Embassy of Switzerland.); Interests section opened at the Czechoslovak (1977–1991) and Swiss embassies (1991–2015)
Ramón Sánchez-Parodi Montoto	Chief of Mission (a.i.)	In office: 1977–1989	Fidel Castro
José Antonio Arbesú	Chief of Mission (a.i.)	In office: 1989–1992	Fidel Castro
Alfonso Fraga	Chief of Mission (a.i.)	In office: 1992–1998	Fidel Castro
Fernando Remírez de Estenoz Barciela	Chief of Mission (a.i.)	In office: 1998–2001	Fidel Castro
Dagoberto Rodríguez Barrera	Chief of Mission (a.i.)	In office: 2001–2007	Fidel Castro
Jorge Bolaños	Chief of Mission (a.i.)	In office: 2007–2012	Fidel Castro
José Ramón Cabañas Rodríguez	Chief of Mission (a.i.)	In office: 2012–2015	Raúl Castro
20 July 2015: Relations resumed
José Ramón Cabañas Rodríguez	Ambassador Extraordinary and Plenipotentiary	September 17, 2015; In office: 2015–2020	Raúl Castro
Lianys Torres Rivera	Chargé d'Affaires	2021–present	Miguel Díaz-Canel

== See also ==
- Cuba–United States relations
- List of ambassadors of the United States to Cuba
