= Hevia (surname) =

Hevia is a surname. Notable people with the surname include:

- Aurelio Hevia (1866-1945), Cuban colonel and politician
- Beatriz Hevia (born 1992), Chilean politician
- Carlinos, full name Carlos Menéndez Hevia (born 1987), Spanish footballer
- Carlos Hevia (1900–1964), Cuban politician
- Chus Hevia (born 1990), Spanish footballer
- Edel Hevia (born 1977), Cuban sprinter
- Eva Hevia (born 1976), Spanish professor
- Fabian Hevia, Chilean-born Australian jazz percussionist
- José Ángel Blanco Hevia (born 1985), Spanish footballer
- Laura Mestre Hevia (1867–1944), Cuban translator, humanist and writer
- Liuba María Hevia (born 1964), Cuban singer and composer
- Ramón López (baseball), full name José Ramón López Hevia (1933–1982), Cuban baseball player
- Sebastián Leyton, full name Sebastián Ignacio Leyton Hevia (born 1993), Chilean footballer
- Torcuato Fernández-Miranda y Hevia (1915–1980), Spanish politician

== See also ==
- Francisco Diego Díaz de Quintanilla y de Hevía y Valdés (1587–1656), Spanish Roman Catholic bishop
- Gutierre de Hevia (??–1772), Spanish admiral
- Hevia (born 1967), Spanish bagpipes player
