= Clemente G. Gomez-Rodriguez =

Cuban lawyer and writer

- Born: January 25, 1939 (age 86); Havana, Cuba
- Spouse: (1961–1980) Gladys Brito-Izquerdo
- Children: Maria del Carmen Gomez Brito (1962- ) Elisa Alina Gomez-Brito(1963- ) Clemente Romualdo Gomez-Brito (1967- ) Clemente Segundo Gomez-Gonzalez (1982- )
- Parent(s): Clemente R. Gomez-Sicre (1906–1983); Maria del Carmen Rodriguez-Fontanills (1915–1943)

Clemente Guillermo Gomez-Rodriguez (born January 25, 1939, in Havana, Cuba) is a former defense lawyer forced out of a 22-year-long legal criminal practice career in Cuba as punishment after his release from prison Combinado del Este for trying to leave the country. He is now a Spanish-language writer in the United States.

== Life and career ==
Gomez studied in Catholic school in Cuba (La Salle) and also school La Luz). He was arrested at age 16 in 1955 for participating in a rally against the regime of Fulgencio Batista and sent to Prison Castillo del Principe. He finished high school and went on to study law at the Law School of the University of Havana graduated 1967. As a defense attorney, he participated in over fifteen thousand criminal cases, including as a member of the defense team on the famous case of General and former Cuban Minister of the Interior Jose Abrantes Fernandez (Case #2-1989). Gomez also worked as Assistant Professor of Criminal Law Procedure at the Law School of the University of Havana.

Gomez speaks three languages, Spanish, English and Italian.

Gomez was arrested for trying to leave Cuba and spent two years in prison. Upon his release, he was allowed to go to the United States as a political refugee in 1994, with most of his family. He was assisted in entering the United States by his cousin's son, Alonso R. del Portillo, Assistant District Director to Congresswoman Ileana Ros-Lehtinen. He was naturalized as a U.S. citizen in 2001. His last employment in U.S. was as public assistance specialist at the Department of Children and Families of the State of Florida. Due to ill health, he retired to dedicate the rest of his life to writing. His first book, Te Van A Fusilar (They Will Execute You), was published in 2007.

== Family ==
Gomez lives in Miami as well as three of his children. Gomez is the son of former Cuban Army Major Clemente Ricardo Gomez-Sicre (1906–1983) and Maria del Carmen Rodriguez-Fontanills (1915–1943). He and his first wife, Gladys Brito-Izquerdo (1941- ) had three children, Dr. Maria del Carmen (1962- ), Dr. Elisa Alina (1963- ) and Clemente Romualdo Gomez-Brito (1967- ). he also had one son, Clemente Segundo Gomez-Gonzalez (1982- ). Gomez divorced (2008) from second wife. He has seven grandchildren.

Gomez' sister, Isolina Elisa (1942- ), is married to Cuban diplomat Dr. Alfonso Fraga-Perez, and still lives in Havana, Cuba. His other sister, Guillermina (1940- ), is married to Jose Ribe-Lorenzo and lives in Hialeah, Florida.

Gomez is the grandson of the Brigadier General Clemente Romualdo Gomez-Diaz, who served in the Cuban Independence War as chief of North Brigade of the Province of Matanzas. He is the nephew of José Gómez-Sicre, who aside from working as a lawyer was also a noted art critic and author and Principal and founder of the Visual Arts Department at the Pan American Union in Washington, D.C. Gomez has other close relatives that has also contributed to the arts in Cuba; his great-granduncle Antonio Rodríguez Ferrer authored the musical introductory notes to the Cuban national anthem, while his cousin, sculptor Juan José Sicre created the most famous sculpture of José Martí y Pérez, located at Havana's Plaza de la Revolución.

== Television appearances ==
- Polos Opuestos, June 2007, on WSBS TV (Mega TV) - One hour interview with Maria Elvira Salazar about his book, Te Van a Fusilar.
