= Nicolas Arroyo =

Cuban politician (1917–2008)

Nicolás Arroyo

Cuban Minister of Public Works
- In office 1952–1958
- President: Fulgencio Batista

20th Cuban Ambassador to the United States
- In office 1958 – January 1959
- President: Fulgencio Batista
- Preceded by: Miguel Ángel de la Campa y Caraveda
- Succeeded by: Ernesto Dihigo

Personal details
- Born: Nicolas Arroyo y Marquez; 31 August 1917 Havana, Cuba
- Died: 13 July 2008 (aged 90) Washington, D.C.
- Spouse: Gabriela Menendez Garcia-Beltran (1942–2008)
- Children: Nicolas Arroyo-Menendez
- Education: University of Havana
- Profession: Architect

Nicolás Arroyo Márquez (31 August 1917 in Havana, Cuba - 13 July 2008 in Washington, D.C.) was a Cuban architect, diplomat and minister. He was the last Cuban Ambassador to the United States in 1958 before Fidel Castro's rise to power. He had previously served in the government of Fulgencio Batista as the Minister of Public Works (1952–1958).

== Early life and education ==
Arroyo was the third of five children born to lawyer Nicholas Arroyo, and Hortensia Marquez. He received his architecture degree from the University of Havana in 1941 and practiced in Cuba until 1959, during which time he also served as Cuba's minister of public works.

== Career ==
Arroyo was the Cuban ambassador to the United States from 1957 to 1958. After the 1959 Cuban revolution, he settled in Washington, D.C., and established an architectural practice focused on residential and commercial projects; he also had business interests in South America and Arlington, Virginia. Arroyo was a member of the American Institute of Architects and served on the U.S. Commission of Fine Arts from 1971 to 1976.

== Personal life ==
In December 1942, he married fellow architect Gabriela Menendez Garcia-Beltran (died 10 July 2008) and formed the architectural firm "Arroyo y Menendez."

Diplomatic posts
Preceded by Miguel Ángel de la Campa y Caraveda	Cuban Ambassador to the United States; 1958–1959	Succeeded by Ernesto Dihigo
