= Luis Andrés Vargas Gómez =

Cuban lawyer, economist, diplomat and anti-Castro activist

Luis Andrés Vargas Gómez (14 May 1915 in Havana, Cuba – 13 January 2003 in Coral Gables, Florida) was a Cuban lawyer, economist, diplomat and anti-Castro activist who spent 21 years in Cuban prisons.

== Family and early life ==
He was the son of Pedro Vargas and Margarita Gómez-Toro (the daughter of General Maximo Gómez). At the age of fifteen, he and his brother Pedro "Muño" Vargas Gomez joined the Communist Revolutionary Union to fight against the Gerardo Machado regime but were expelled in August 1932 along with others who criticized the Communist International (Comintern) analysis of the Cuban social and political situation. The Vargas brothers and the other dissidents then founded the Trotskyist Bolshevik-Leninist Party (PBL) and went underground until the fall of the Machado government in August 1933. In Dec. 1935, he was appointed chancellor of the Cuban consulate in Key West, Florida, and in Sept. 1936 was assigned to the Cuban consulate in New Orleans, Louisiana.

== Education ==
In the fall semester of 1937, he enrolled as a freshman in the College of Arts and Sciences at Tulane University. Vargas attended only one semester and his photograph is not included in the 1937-38 yearbook, although the name "Andrew Vargas" is listed under the names of students whose images do not appear in the class panels.

== Foreign ministry ==
Vargas returned to Havana in July 1938 to work in the Foreign Ministry. He enrolled in the University of Havana School of Law and graduated in 1944. His first marriage on January 3, 1934 to Helen Small Whyte, the widow of diplomat Calixto Eugenio Sanchez Garcia and mother of revolutionary martyr Calixto Sanchez Whyte, ended in divorce on April 9, 1956. They had no children of their own. On February 1, 1960, Vargas married Maria Teresa de la Campa y Roff] (the daughter of Batista's Foreign Minister, Miguel Ángel de la Campa y Caraveda), who had two children from a previous marriage.

In January 1959, under Fidel Castro's revolutionary regime, Vargas remained in his previous post as Ambassador in charge of the Economic Division of the Ministry of State due to his friendship with the new Foreign Minister, Raúl Roa García, a 1930s Communist militant. On March 3, 1960, Vargas began his appointment as the Cuban Ambassador to the United Nations European offices in Geneva. He defected a month later and went into exile in Coral Gables, Florida.

== Bay of Pigs invasion and imprisonment ==
Vargas became involved in the planning of the ill-fated Bay of Pigs Invasion after joining the Cuban Democratic Revolutionary Front and served as the director of their clandestine radio station sponsored by the Central Intelligence Agency (CIA). Five days before the invasion, on April 12, 1961, he re-entered Cuba with his wife. After the failure of the invasion, they received asylum in the Ecuadorian Embassy in Havana. The Castro regime denied Vargas a safe-conduct pass, but his wife was allowed to soon leave for Miami. A year later, Vargas was enticed out of his sanctuary by a traitor who promised to arrange a covert trip to Florida, but he was arrested while hiding in a farm in Calabazar. Vargas was sentenced to death by firing squad by a revolutionary tribunal, Case No. 318 of May 23, 1962, but the sentence was commuted to 20 years after his mother, a revolutionary activist, pleaded on his behalf. His brother Pedro was a Communist who supported Fidel Castro.

== Release and later years ==
Vargas served twenty years and seven months before being released on December 25, 1982. He was allowed to rejoin his wife in exile when civil rights activist Jesse Jackson convinced Fidel Castro to release Vargas and 25 other political prisoners on June 28, 1984. Soon after, he joined the Cuban American National Foundation.

From 1986–1999, he wrote a column for El Nuevo Herald. He died of kidney failure on January 13, 2003, in his home in Coral Gables.
