= Alberto Cabrera =

Alberto Cabrera may refer to:

- Alberto Cabrera (baseball) (born 1988), Dominican professional pitcher
- Alberto Pedro Cabrera (1945–2000), Argentine basketball player
- Alberto García Cabrera
- Alberto Inocente Cabrera Álvarez
