= Dihigo =

Dihigo is a surname. Notable people with the surname include:

- Ernesto Dihigo (1896–1991), Cuban jurist, diplomat, and professor
- Martín Dihigo (1906–1971), Cuban baseball player
