= Carlos Hevia =

Cuban politician (1900–1964)

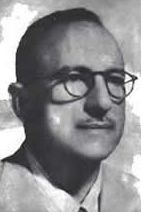

President of Cuba Interim
- In office 15 January 1934 – 18 January 1934
- Vice President: None
- Preceded by: Ramón Grau
- Succeeded by: Manuel Márquez Sterling (Interim)

Personal details
- Born: Carlos Aurelio Hevia y de los Reyes-Gavilan; March 21, 1900 Havana, Cuba
- Died: April 2, 1964 (aged 64) Lantana, Florida, United States
- Party: Cuban Revolutionary Party
- Spouse: Elisa Edelmann
- Children: Aurelio Carlos and Margarita Hevia-Edelmann
- Occupation: Politician, businessman
- Profession: Naval engineer

Carlos Aurelio Hevia y de los Reyes-Gavilan (March 21, 1900 – April 2, 1964) was the interim President of Cuba, serving for less than three days. During the third week of 1934, Hevia was President from 5:00 p.m. on Monday, January 15, until 1:20 a.m. on Thursday, January 18. Cuban junta leader Fulgencio Batista had obtained the resignation of Hevia's predecessor, Ramón Grau. The choice of Hevia was unpopular with the military, and by Wednesday, the new President was asked to resign. He was replaced by Manuel Márquez Sterling.

== Presidency of Cuba ==
Hevia was the Agricultural Minister when rioting broke out in Havana protest against the President Grau. The junta requested Grau's resignation and named Hevia as the new president. Hevia initially declined, after hearing the reaction of the mob. After 100 troops arrived from Camp Columbia to guard the presidential palace, Hevia accepted the post at 5:00 Monday afternoon. Hevia met with Batista's rival, union leader Carlos Mendieta, in the early hours of Tuesday morning. Hoping to receive Menideta's endorsement, Hevia came away instead with little more than Mendieta's pledge of neutrality. Hevia was administered the oath of office on Tuesday by his father-in-law, Dr. Juan Federico Edelmann, who was also the president (chief justice) of the Cuban Supreme Court and a 21 gun salute was given from the cannons of the Cabanas Fortress following the inauguration. Meanwhile, labor organizations made plans for a nationwide strike. Wednesday, Hevia was unable to forestall the Nationalist Union's plans for a walkout, and decided that evening to resign. About 40 hours after he had been formally inaugurated, Hevia resigned early Thursday morning in favor of Mendieta. He left the presidential palace at 2:15 a.m., saying "I am going back to my cane fields to cut cane."

Hevia had been the first Cuban national to graduate from the United States Naval Academy at Annapolis, as a member of the Class of 1920.

Hevia later broke with Batista and became an important politician in the Autentico party. He served as foreign minister of Cuba from 1948 to 1950, in the administration of Carlos Prio. Hevia was chosen to be the Autentico presidential candidate for the 1952 elections. However, the elections, in which Hevia's main opponents were Roberto Agramonte and Fulgencio Batista, were canceled when Batista took power in a military coup.

Hevia went into exile in the United States and during the early 1960s was part of groups opposed to Fidel Castro who overthrew Batista in 1959.

== Family ==
He was the oldest of six children born to Aurelio Hevia y Alcalde, an attorney, and Sara de los Reyes-Gavilán y de la Guardia. He was married to Elisa Edelmann y Ponce and they had two children, Aurelio Carlos and Margarita Hevia-Edelmann. Hevia, who operated a "private naval academy" in Miami, died of a heart attack on April 2, 1964

== Notes ==
Political offices
Preceded by Ramón Grau	President of Cuba; Interim; 15–18 January 1934	Succeeded by Manuel Márquez Sterling
Preceded by Alberto Inocente Álvarez	Foreign Minister of Cuba; 1948–1950	Succeeded by Ernesto Dihigo y Lopez Trigo
