= José Ramón Cabañas Rodríguez =

Cuban diplomat

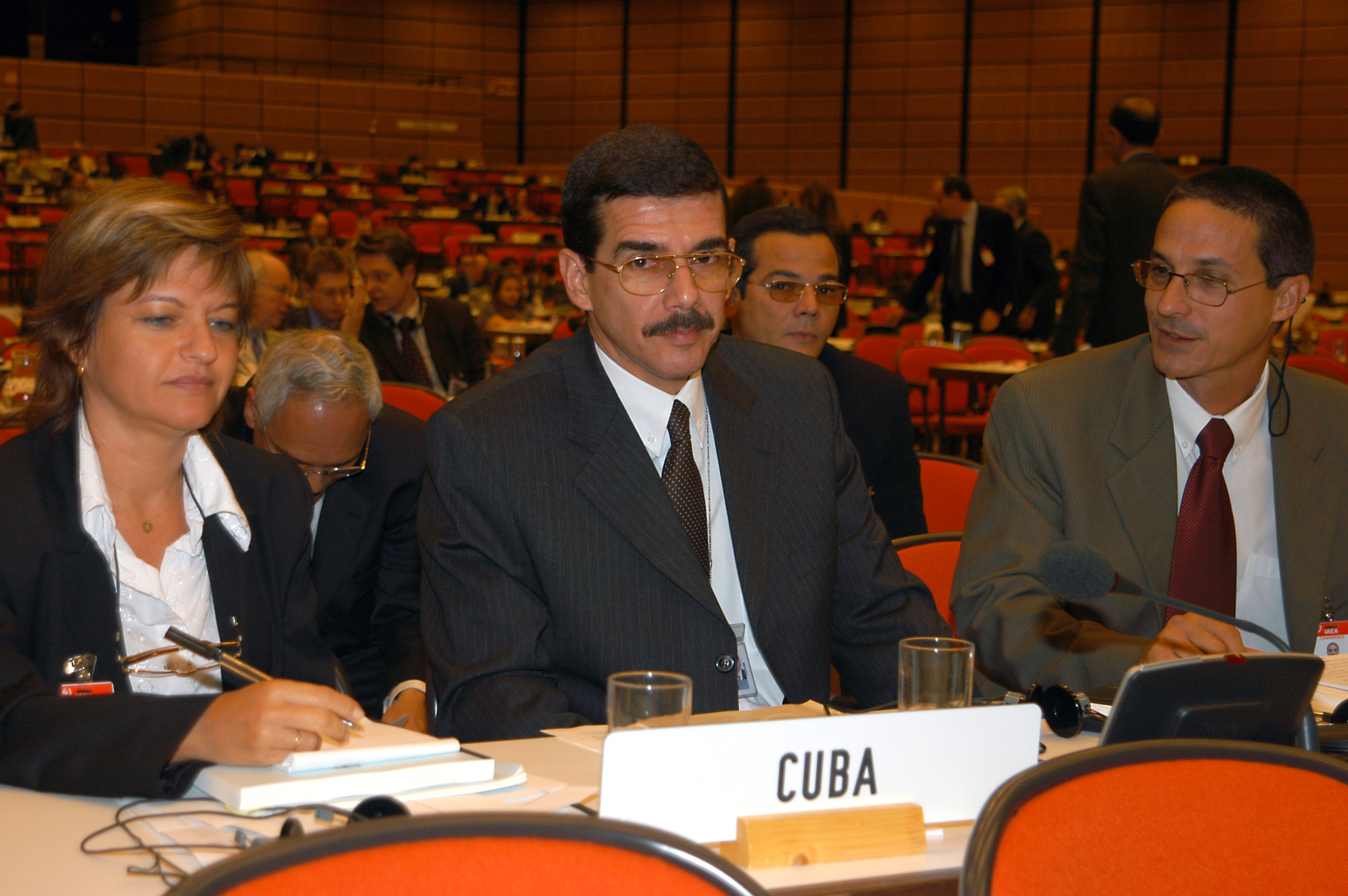
- Cabañas Rodríguez in 2002

22nd Cuban Ambassador to the United States
- In office September 2015 – 21 December 2020
- Preceded by: Ernesto Dihigo (1961)
- Succeeded by: Lianys Torres Rivera

Personal details
- Born: October 8, 1961 (age 64) Cuba

José Ramón Cabañas Rodríguez (born 8 October 1961) is a Cuban diplomat. He became the first Ambassador of Cuba to the United States in 50 years in September 2015. Since 2021, he has been the Director of the Center for International Policy Research (CIPI).

== Biography ==
He was born on October 8, 1961. Rodríguez began his career in 1984 at the Ministry of Foreign Affairs of Cuba, serving as Country Specialist Assistant in the America II Directorate. He continued to advance within the directorate, becoming a Country Specialist from 1987 to 1991. From 1990 to 1992, he served abroad as Third Secretary at the Embassy of Cuba in Ottawa, Canada, followed by a term as Second Secretary from 1992 to 1993. Upon returning to Cuba, he was appointed Deputy Director of the Directorate of the Americas. Between 1994 and 2001, Cabañas Rodríguez served as Director of DACRE (General Division of Consular Affairs And Cuban Residents Abroad), a department within MINREX. In 2001, he was appointed Ambassador of Cuba to Austria, a post he held until 2006, after which he became Director of the Document Management Department (2006-2009), subsequently the Vice Minister of the ministry under Bruno Rodríguez Parrilla (2009-2012). In 2015, he became Ambassador of Cuba to the United States, serving until 2021. Since 2021, Cabañas Rodríguez has been Director of the Center for International Policy Research (CIPI).

He is fluent in French and English.
