= Ada Kouri Barreto =

Cuban revolutionary (1917–2005)

Ada Kourí Barreto
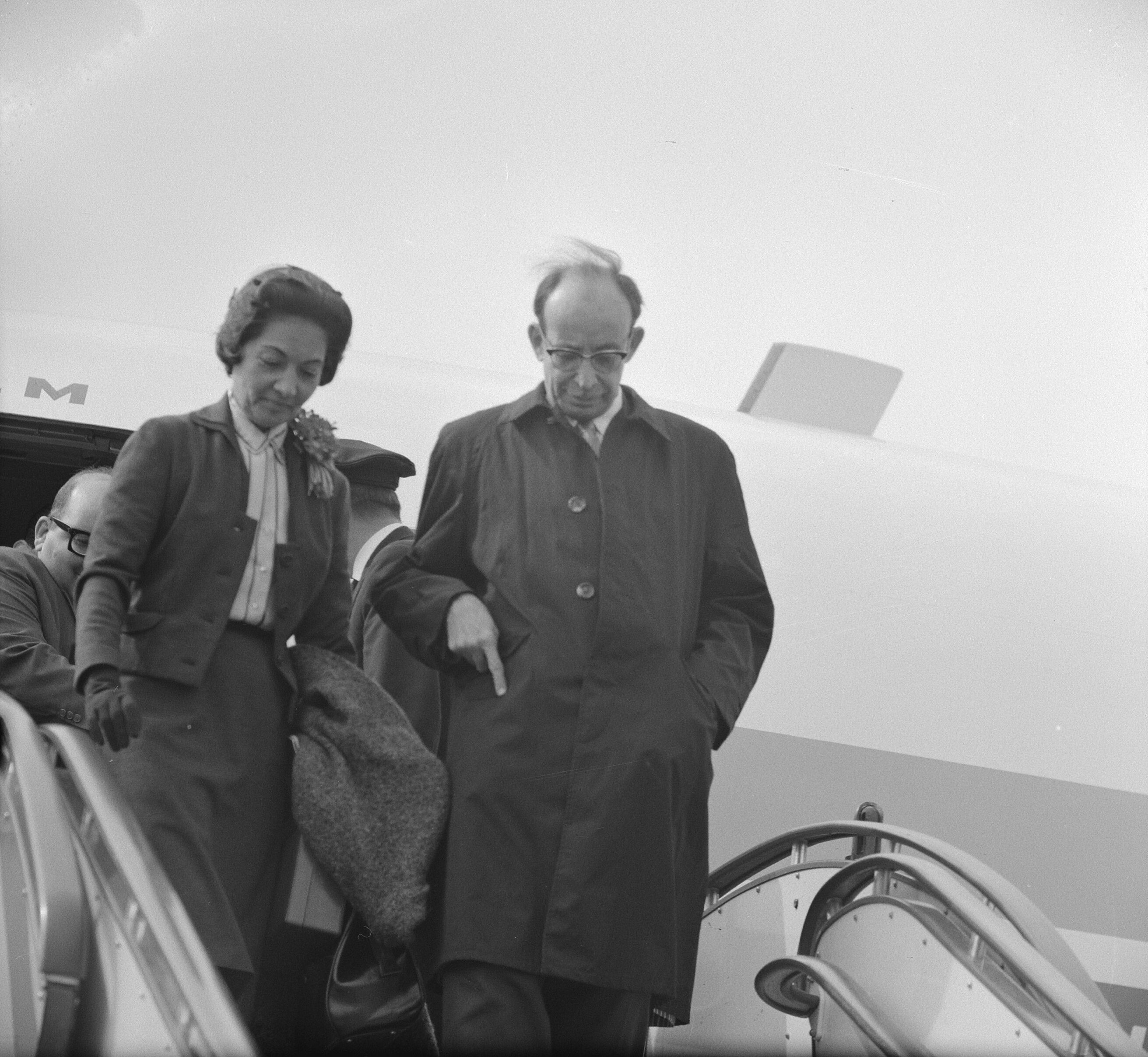
- Ada Kouri & Raúl Roa (1961)
- Born: May 26, 1917; Havana, Cuba
- Died: July 11, 2005 (aged 88); Rome, Italy

Dr. Ada Kouri Barreto (May 26, 1917 in Havana, Cuba – July 11, 2005 in Rome, Italy) was a Cuban cardiologist and revolutionary. She was the wife of the Foreign Minister of Cuba, Raúl Roa García, and mother to the Cuban diplomat, Raúl Roa Kouri.

Kouri was the eldest daughter of seven children of the prominent surgeon and Professor of Medicine at the University of Havana, Dr. Juan Bautista Kouri Esmeja and Dr. Josefina Barreto. Her siblings were Josefina, Marta Alicia, Silvia Margarita, Juan, Julio and Nejhie Kouri-Barreto.

As a young woman, she was a militant of the Student Left Wing (Ala Izquierda Estudiantil) and after the March 1935 strike she joined her husband in exile in New York. After March 10, 1952, she took part in the anti-Batista movement as a physician, caring for clandestine combatants and other tasks of Civic Resistance.

During the first years of the Revolution she was the director of the Hygiene Institute. A member of the Federation of Cuban Women Federación de Mujeres Cubanas (FMC), the Milicias Nacionales Revolucionarias and Comités de Defensa de la Revolución (CDR).

She died in Rome where she was accompanying her son Raúl Roa Kouri at the Cuban Embassy to the Holy See, victim of a cardiac-respiratory arrest at the age of 88.
