= Isidoro Malmierca Peoli =

Cuban politician (1930–2001)

Minister of Foreign Affairs
- In office 1976–1992
- President: Fidel Castro
- Preceded by: Raúl Roa García
- Succeeded by: Ricardo Alarcón

Personal details
- Born: 25 September 1930 Havana, Cuba
- Died: 11 August 2001 (aged 70) Havana, Cuba

Isidoro Octavia Malmierca Peoli (25 September 1930 – 11 August 2001) was a Cuban politician who was Cuba's foreign minister from 1976 to 1992 and founder of the Cuban Communist Party.

== Early life ==
Born in Havana, he became involved in Cuba's turbulent left-wing politics as a young man, joining the tiny Popular Socialist Party, the Moscow-line predecessor of the Communist Party, during the years of right-wing regimes that preceded the 1959 revolution. The PSP had only a few thousand members, but was well-organized and had strong links with the urban unions.

== Role in Cuban Revolution ==
The PSP at first played little part in Fidel Castro's armed struggle against the dictatorship of General Fulgencio Batista, which took place mainly in the countryside, and only threw its weight behind Castro's guerrilla campaign a few months before Batista finally fled the country. Until then, it had tended to denounce the young rebels' "adventurism."

Despite this background of mistrust, when Castro moved the revolution sharply to the left in the early 1960s, he found a use for the PSP apparatus, and for young but experienced activists such as Malmierca, in giving a disciplined organizational underpinning to his embryonic regime.

Malmierca was one of the founders of the powerful state security apparatus — a role for which his reluctance to reveal even the most innocuous details about his personal life must have been an advantage. He was one of the functionaries who supervised the merger of the PSP with Castro's July 26 Movement to form the Cuban Communist Party in 1965.

In both of these functions, Malmierca had to balance the professional politicians and the young idealists who had followed Castro into the hills in the mid-1950s. He performed this difficult task well enough to earn advancement, becoming a member of the new party's central committee and being made editor of its official organ, the daily newspaper Granma.

== Foreign minister ==
The high point of Malmierca's career as a faithful servant of the Cuban Revolution came in December 1976, when he replaced the veteran left-wing intellectual Raúl Roa García as foreign minister, and was also appointed vice-president of the council of ministers.

Malmierca remained at the foreign ministry until 1992, when he was succeeded by his deputy, Ricardo Alarcón. By that time, Malmierca was in poor health and he was given a relatively undemanding job that made use of both his journalistic experience and foreign contacts, as director of Tips-Cuba, an official information service for prospective foreign investors.

== Death ==
He died on August 11, 2001, in Havana from lung cancer.

Political offices
| Preceded by Raúl Roa García | Foreign Minister of Cuba; 1976–1992 | Succeeded by Ricardo Alarcón |
