= Aureliano Sánchez Arango =

Cuban lawyer and politician

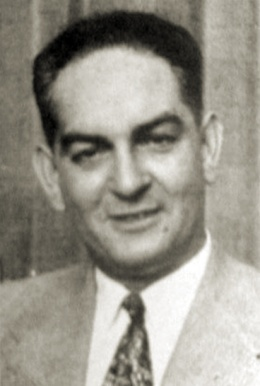

Foreign Minister of Cuba
- In office 1951–1952
- President: Carlos Prío Socarrás

Education Minister of Cuba
- In office 1948–1951
- President: Carlos Prío Socarrás

Personal details
- Born: 7 June 1907; Cuba
- Died: 23 April 1976 (aged 67); Miami, Florida, US

Aureliano Sánchez Arango (7 June 1907 – 23 April 1976) was a Cuban lawyer, politician and university professor.

Sanchez served in the government of President Carlos Prio Socarras first as Minister of Education (1948–1951) and then as Foreign Minister (1951–1952). In August 1951, Eduardo Chibas accused Sanchez of stealing children's breakfast funds to build a housing project in Guatemala. When Chibas could not prove his accusations, he committed suicide on live radio.

After Fulgencio Batista overthrew Prio, Sanchez was involved in various undergrown movements to overthrow Batista. He was originally granted asylum in Mexico in 1952, After returning to Cuba to plan an assassination attempt against Batista, he was granted refuge at the Uruguayan embassy. He later helped finance Fidel Castro in overthrowing Batista and later went into permanent exile to the United States.

He was married to Estrella Echeverria on January 22, 1936, at the Parish Church of Vedado, Havana, Cuba, who had two children, Alfredo and Delia (Lela) Sánchez Echeverría.

His son, Alfredo Sánchez Echeverría (1936-12/15/2021) was ordered executed by the Castro regime but his sentence was commuted to 30 years and he served 14 years in prison (1961–1975). Sanchez Echeverria was allowed to go into exile in 1977, a few months after his father had died of a heart attack.

Political offices
Preceded by Óscar Gans	Foreign Minister of Cuba; 1951–1952	Succeeded by Miguel Ángel de la Campa y Caraveda
