= Alberto de la Campa y Roff =

Cuban diplomat

Cuban Ambassador to Italy
- In office Unknown – 3 January 1959
- President: Fulgencio Batista

Personal details
- Born: 28 October 1918 Calabasar, Cuba
- Died: May 1964 (aged 45) Washington, D.C.
- Spouse: Martha de la Torre
- Profession: Diplomat

Alberto de la Campa y Roff (28 October 1918 – May 1964) was a Cuban diplomat.

Campa served as the Cuban Ambassador to Italy until January 3, 1959, when he resigned when the government of Fidel Castro overthrew Fulgencio Batista.

Campa was married to Martha de la Torre y Silva, and they had three children, Adela Maria, Miguel Angel, and Alberto. He was the son of another Cuban diplomat Miguel Ángel de la Campa y Caraveda.
