= José Gómez-Sicre =

Cuban lawyer, art critic and writer (1916–1991)

Jose Gomez Sicre
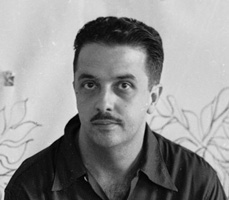
- Jose Gomez Sicre
- Born: July 6, 1916; Matanzas, Cuba
- Died: July 22, 1991 (aged 75); Washington, D.C.

José Gómez Sicre (July 6, 1916 in Matanzas, Cuba – July 22, 1991 in Washington, D.C.) was a noted Cuban lawyer, art critic and writer.

== Education ==
Gómez Sicre graduated from the University of Havana in 1941 with degrees in Consular Law and Politics, and later took courses in art history at New York University and Columbia University. Although he was a lawyer by trade, his professional career was spent working promoting Latin American artists and their art for 50 years. Gómez Sicre was a critic, researcher and writer, publishing numerous reports and articles on Latin American artists. Most importantly, Gómez-Sicre provided Latin American artists with an introduction to the audience in the United States and the world.

== Involvement in the arts ==
José Gómez Sicre's involvement in the world of art began early. In the 1940s, he was responsible for organizing exhibitions of Cuban art that traveled to various Latin American countries in his position as Director of Exhibits of the Institución Hispanocubana de Cultura (Hispano-Cuban Institution of Culture). In 1944, he served as an advisor to Alfred H. Barr, Jr., of the Museum of Modern Art (MoMA) in New York City, putting together an exhibition of Cuban paintings that traveled across the United States for the next two years.

Gómez Sicre began his influential work for the Pan-American Union's Visual Arts Unit in 1946 as a Specialist (the Pan-American Union later became the Organization of American States, OAS, in 1948. In 1948, Gómez-Sicre was promoted to the position of Chief in the Visual Arts Unit and remained in that post until 1976. Under his leadership, the Visual Arts Unit began to actively collect works of Latin American art beginning in 1957 with financial support of O.A.S., instead of relying solely on donations. Gómez-Sicre served as editor for Boletin de Artes Visuales, an illustrated documentation of exhibitions throughout North America, which published from 1957-1973. The Art Museum of the Americas was established in 1976 by the O.A.S. Permanent Council and Gómez-Sicre served as its founder and director.

== Published works ==
José Gómez Sicre published many books, both for O.A.S. and on his own, some which include: Mario Carreño (1943), Cuban Painting Today (1944), Spanish Master Drawings XV to XVIII Centuries (1951), Four Artists of the Americas (O.A.S., 1957), Guide to Public Collections in Latin America (O.A.S., 2 vols., 1956, 1968), Leonardo Nierman (1971), and Jose Luis Cuevas: Self-Portrait with Model (1983). He also wrote and co-directed the scripts of more than twelve films on art in Latin America for the O.A.S. Articles he wrote appeared in publications like Norte, Art News, Art in America, Americas, Art International, Le Connoiseur, Social Education, L’oeil, Boulletin of the Dade, Vision, Lampara, Vanidades, Hombre de Mundo, Miami Replicas.

== Family ==
Dr. Gómez Sicre was the son of Clemente Gómez and Guillermina Sicre. His mother was a significant presence in his life, living with him in Washington D.C. until she died in 1974.

In 1951, he married Lucia Ballerin, but later divorced her in 1955. His nephew is also a lawyer and writer and a collector of art, Clemente Guillermo Gomez-Rodriguez. His personal and professional papers repository is at the Benson Latin American Collection, at the University of Texas at Austin.
