= Fernando Remírez de Estenoz =

Cuban politician and diplomat

Fernando Remírez de Estenoz Barciela
- Born: 9 October 1951; Guanabacoa, Cuba

Fernando Remírez de Estenoz Barciela (born 9 October 1951) is a Cuban politician and diplomat.

Remírez de Estenoz is a medical doctor who graduated from the University of Havana. He is married and has two children.

Remírez de Estenoz was Head of the Cuban Communist Party Foreign Relations Department from 2004 until March 2009. He has been from 1992 First Vice Minister of Foreign Affairs. Head of the Cuban Interests Section in Washington, D.C. from 1995 to 2001. Cuban UN Ambassador from 1993 to 1994.

Preceded by Alcibiades Hidalgo	Permanent Representative of Cuba to the United Nations; 1993–1994	Succeeded by Bruno Rodriguez Parrilla
Preceded by Alfonso Fraga	Chief of Cuban Interests Section; 1995–2001	Succeeded by Dagoberto Rodríguez Barrera
