= Candelaria Figueredo =

Cuban patriot (1852–1914)

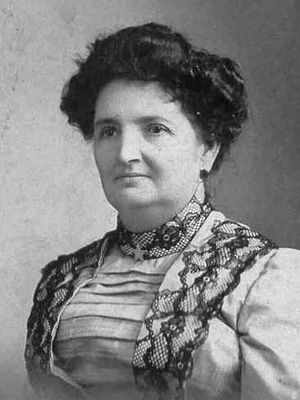
- Born: December 11, 1852; Bayamo, Cuba
- Died: January 19, 1914 (aged 61); Havana, Cuba
- Other names: "Canducha"

Candelaria Figueredo (born December 11, 1852, Bayamo, Cuba – died January 19, 1914, Havana, Cuba) was a Cuban patriot who fought in the Cuban struggle for independence from Spain.

== Life ==
Candelaria Figueredo was the daughter of lawyer Pedro Figueredo y Cisneros, a Cuban nationalist revolutionary who fought against the Spanish in the war of Cuban independence from 1868 known as the Ten Years' War. Her mother was Isabel Vázquez y Moreno.

She herself joined the struggle in October 1868 aged only 16 when her father asked her to carry the independent Cuban flag into battle at Bayamo. She accepted the risky task enthusiastically and entered the town seated on a white horse carrying the newly designed flag.

A large Spanish force recaptured Bayamo in 1869 and she and her family fled into the Sierra Maestra where they lived the lives of fugitives constantly on the run. On July 15, 1871, she was captured by the Spanish, together with her 14-year-old sister and 12-year-old brother. They were imprisoned in the Fortress of Zaragoza in Manzanillo, where they were interrogated. Candelaria, and her siblings were finally ordered to leave Cuba by October 17, 1871, or face deportation to the island of Fernando Poo (now called Bioko) off the west coast of Africa. They sailed from Manzanillo on the schooner Annie bound for New York on October 13, despite there being a hurricane in the vicinity. Candelaria is supposed to have persuaded the captain to sail with the words: "It is a question of necessity. I prefer a thousand times to be food for the sharks than that of the Spaniards".

She was reunited there with her mother and other sisters in Key West, Florida. There Candelaria learned of the death of her father and of her brother, Gustavo in the struggle. She became very sick, in part because of this news, and in part because of the three years she had spent as a fugitive with inadequate diet and shelter. She was sent to Nassau, Bahamas to rest and recover but soon returned to Key West to be with her family.

In 1877, she married another Cuban exile, Federico del Portillo, who had studied law at the University of Havana but had fled to escape Spanish execution of students. They had nine children of their own including Rosalia, Zenayda, Federico, Lorenzo, Piedad, and Elisa.

In 1901, following the Spanish–American War, Candelaria and Federico returned to Cuba and settled in Havana. There they saw the Cuban flag finally raised over the Castillo del Morro on May 20, 1902. Candelaria died on January 19, 1914, and was buried, with full military honors in the Cementerio de Colón in Havana. Her coffin was covered by the flag that she had carried into Bayamo 45 years earlier.

Her autobiography was published posthumously in 1929.

== Bibliography ==
- La abanderada de 1868:Candelaria Figueredo (hija de Perucho) Autobiografia. Havana :Comision Patriotica "pro Himno Nacuional" a la Mujer Cubana. 1929. Autobiography
