= Ramón Sánchez-Parodi Montoto =

Cuban politician (1938–2024)

Ramón Sánchez-Parodi Montoto (25 September 1938 – 11 December 2024) was a Cuban diplomat and writer. Sánchez-Parodi served as the first chief of the Cuban Interests Section in Washington, D.C. from September 1977 to April 1989. He then served as deputy foreign minister (1989–1994) and as ambassador to Brazil (1994–2000). He was chief of the Department of International Relations at Cuba's Customs Agency and worked as a journalist and writer.

Sánchez-Parodi died on 11 December 2024, at the age of 87.

| Preceded by --None-- | Chief of Cuban Interests Section; 1977–1989 | Succeeded by José Antonio Arbesú |
