= Granma (newspaper) =

Official newspaper of the Cuban Communist Party

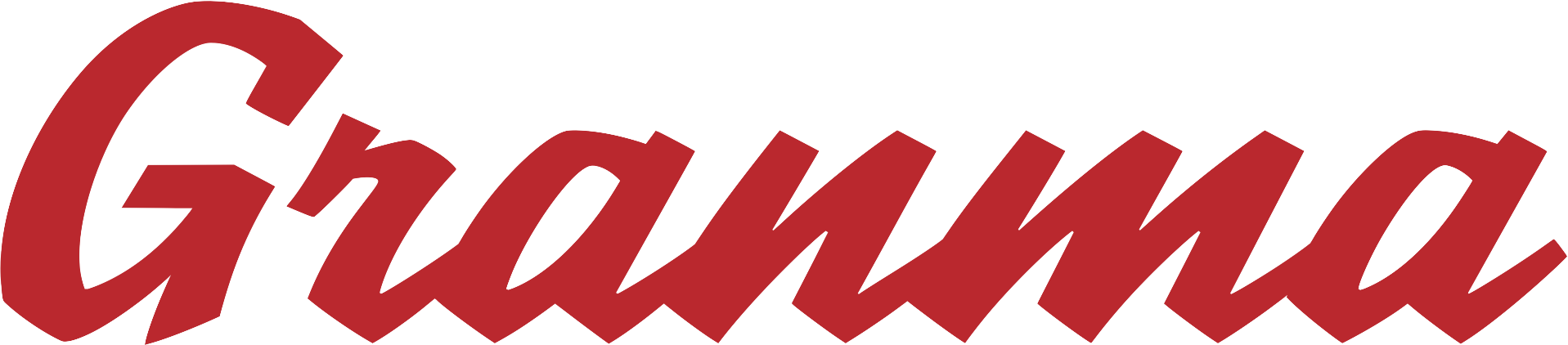
- Type: Weekly newspaper
- Format: Broadsheet
- Owner: Cuban government
- Founder: Fidel Castro
- Editor: Yailin Orta Rivera
- Founded: October 4, 1965; 60 years ago
- Political alignment: Communist Party of Cuba
- Language: Spanish, English, French, Portuguese, Italian, German
- Headquarters: Plaza de la Revolución, Havana, Cuba
- Country: Cuba
- ISSN: 0864-0424
- Website: granma.cu

Granma (Spanish pronunciation: [ˈɡɾamma]) is a state-owned newspaper published by the Central Committee of the Communist Party of Cuba; it was founded in 1965. Publication of the newspaper began in February 1966. The newspaper has been a way for the Communist Party of Cuba to communicate their ideology to the world, especially regarding the United States. Granma is Cuba's most widely distributed newspaper.

== History ==
=== 1960s ===
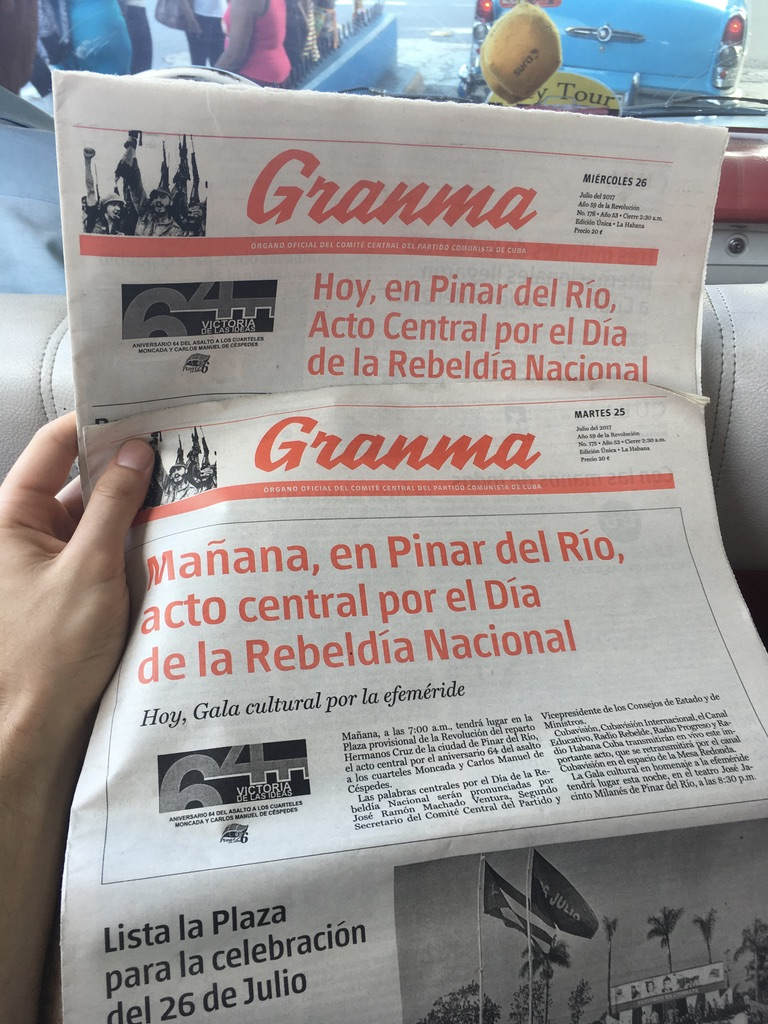
Two copies of Granma, July 26, 2017

Granma was established in 1965 by order of Fidel Castro to promote unity after the Cuban revolution. The newspaper was formed through the merger of two previous newspapers: Revolución, organ of the Communist Party of Cuba and Hoy, organ of the 26th of July movement. The newspaper was named after yacht Granma, on which Castro and 81 other rebels landed in Cuba in 1956. The first issue of Granma was published on October 4, 1965. Designer Horacio Rodriguez and artist Adigio Benitez designed several variations of logos for Granma, one of which was selected by Castro.

The newspaper is the official organ of the Central Committee of the Communist Party of Cuba. Granma has tended to focus on events occurring in and around Havana. In regards to political events, it has tended to focus on events supportive of the party and government, while excluding events that do not support these institutions. Reportedly, Fidel Castro regularly visited the newspaper's editorial offices and influenced the material published there, treating Granma as his "personal bulletin".

In 1966, Granma began publishing a weekly edition in Spanish, English and French languages. The edition became Granma Internacional in 1991, and became available in Turkish, German, Italian and Portuguese. The first editor editor-in-chief of the newspaper was Isidoro Malmierca Peoli, who had little experience in journalism prior to joining the newspaper. He served in the position for two years and was succeeded by Jorge Enrique Mendoza in 1967, a friend of Fidel Castro.

=== 1970s–1990s ===
In July 1973, the newspaper's circulation exceeded one million copies. In 1978, the newspaper began to be printed in Argentina. In 1987, Jorge Enrique Mendoza was succeeded by Enrique Román. Under his leadership, the newspaper suffered layoffs and lower circulation due to paper shortage. In 1992, the newspaper began to be printed in Brazil and Mexico, and by 1994, it was also being printed in Spain. The website for Granma was created in August 1996, making Granma the first media organization in Cuba to have a website. The Granma daily news was first published on a separate website in July 1997, and the two sites were later merged. The website includes versions of the newspaper in five languages other than Spanish, and updates all of these versions daily.

In late 1990s, Cuban army colonel Frank Agüero was appointed as editor-in-chief of the newspaper. Under his leadership, the newspaper began translating Fidel Castro's speeches into new languages. On October 18, 1998, his speech was translated in Portuguese at 8th Ibero-American Summit. On November 1, 1998, the speeches were translated to German and Italian at FIHAV’98 trade fair. In 1999 the newspaper translated the speeches into Russian at June 11, 1999 Culture and Development Congress. After September 11, 2001, Arabic translation was added.

=== 2000s–2020s ===
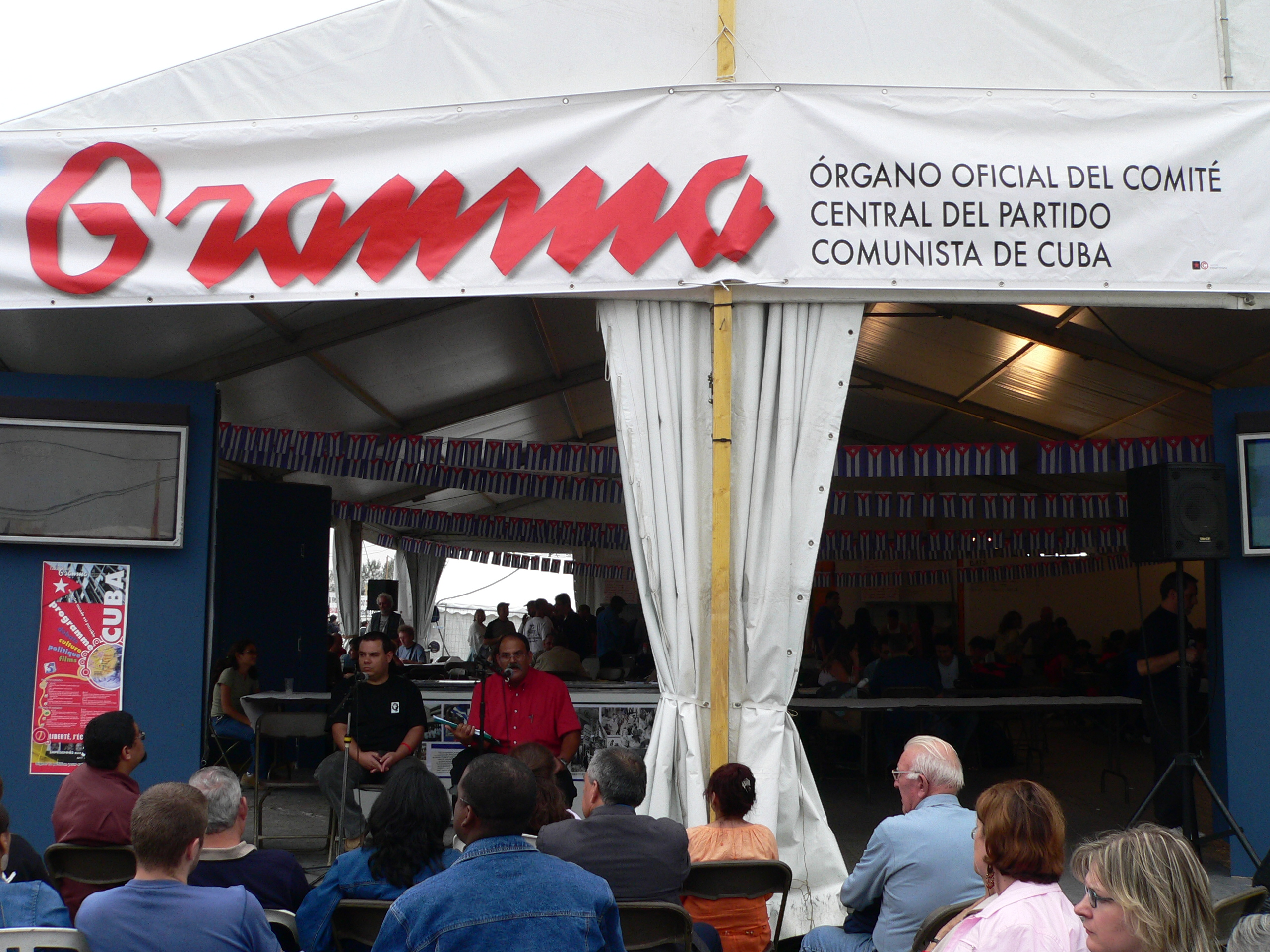
Delegation of Granma at the Fête de l'Humanité, September 2006

In 2005, former deputy director of Juventud Rebelde Lazaro Barredo became editor-in-chief of the newspaper. In 2012, Mairelys Cuevas Gómez, news editor of Granma, fled to Miami during her trip to Mexico. In October 2013, Lazaro Barredo was replaced by Pelayo Terry Cuervo as editor-in-chief. In 2017, Terry Cuervo was fired due to "errors committed in the fulfillment of his responsibilities".

In 2019, the Granma announced that it would reduce its page count from 16 to eight due to a shortage of newsprint. In August 2020, YouTube channels of Granma and other Cuban outlets were suspended. Google stated that their activities violated Export-Import Bank Act of 1945, prohibiting the US from exporting products to Marxist-Leninist countries. Foreign Ministry of Russia condemned the suspension of Granma, stating that it violates "widely accepted democratic principles".

On October 3, 2022, Granma celebrated its 57th anniversary. President of Cuba Miguel Diaz-Canel said the newspaper's founding was a significant day. On March 24, 2025, Granma launched a special section on its website titled "Cuba y Vietnam: Lo del andar", dedicated to celebrating the relationship between Vietnam and Cuba. The section featured over 5,000 archived Vietnamise articles and 200 photos of Hanoi during the Vietnam War. On September 24, 2025, former editor of Juventud Rebelde Yoerky Sánchez Cuéllar became editor-in-chief of the newspaper. In February 2026, Cuban government announced that due to lack of resources, Granma will be printed once a week.

== Content ==
Granma features:

- Speeches by Raúl Castro and other leaders of the Cuban government, including former President Fidel Castro's column, 'Reflexiones de Fidel' meaning 'Fidel's Reflections'.
- Official announcements of the Cuban government
- Popular sketches highlighting the history of Cuba's revolutionary struggle, from the 19th to the 21st century
- Developments in Latin America and world politics
- Steps by Cuba's workers and farmers to defend and advance the socialist revolution
- Developments in industry, agriculture, science, the arts, and sports in Cuba today
- TV listings for that day
- Cuban social, cultural, and political events, such as parades and festivals

=== Cartas a la Dirección ===
Home page of Cartas a la Dirección, September 13, 2026

The Cartas a la Dirección section of Granma contains letters from readers, as well as responses from the editor. It was first included in the newspaper on March 14, 2008, soon after Raúl Castro's speech stating that the Cuban Communist Party is open to criticism. The section has since then become very popular. The letters in this section can involve multiple topics, including complaints and suggestions for the newspaper or the Cuban Communist Party.

Publication of letters to the editor of Granma serve a few functions. First, the publication of the letters acts as a platform in which the Cuban public can directly interact with the editor of the newspaper, as well as with the communist party as a whole. It also serves as a method for the party and the government to stay accountable to the public. Finally, the letters help inform Cuban leadership of matters concerning the people. Initially, very few of the letters published in Cartas a la Dirección received responses, and these responses were often vague and unhelpful. However, Granma, through editorial comments added onto letters and responses, as well as a periodic overview of responses, attempted to pressure government agencies into improving the quality and frequency of their responses. The strategy worked, with 77 percent of letters receiving responses in 2016, improved from only 8.8 percent in 2011.

The section Cartas a la Dirección is not the first time Granma has included letters from readers in the newspaper, but most of these sections were more focused on a certain topic, such as economic statistics or transportation and infrastructure. An exception was A vuelta de correo, which began in 1975 and continued until 1984. Like Cartas a la Dirección, A vuelta de correo included questions from the Cuban public that brought attention to various issues, as well as occasional responses by the government. However, these letters were much less specific than those found in Cartas a la Dirección, and were frequently redacted.

== Editors ==
- 1965–1967 Isidoro Malmierca
- 1967–1987 Jorge Enrique Mendoza
- 1987–1990 Enrique Román
- 1990–1995 Jacinto Granda
- 1995–2005 Frank Agüero
- 2005–2013 Lázaro Barredo
- 2013–2017 Pelayo Terry
- 2025–present Yoerky Sánchez Cuellar

== Bibliography ==
- Horowitz, Irving (1995). Cuban Communism. Transaction Publishers. p. 473. ISBN 9781412820899.
- Jairo, Lugo (April 1, 2008). The Media In Latin America. McGraw-Hill Education. p. 125. ISBN 978-0335222018.
