= Alcibiades Hidalgo =

Cuban politician (born c. 1946)

Alcibíades Hidalgo Basulto (born 1946?) was one of Raúl Castro's Chiefs of Staff for twelve years and also served as Deputy Foreign Minister. Later he served as Cuba's ambassador to the United Nations (1992–1994) replacing Ricardo Alarcón. He was recalled to Havana and sacked from his post. In 2002, Hidalgo boarded a home-made raft and defected to Miami. He has claimed that "virtually every member of Castro's UN mission is an intelligence agent" and "Cuba is, pure and simple, a dictatorship each day more devoid of the attributes that once made it attractive."

An anti-American — for most of his adult life — Cuban intellectual, Mr. Hidalgo graduated from the University of Havana with a degree in journalism. He was editor-in-chief of the Cuban newspaper Trabajadores. He is divorced and has a daughter, Carolina (b. 1991).

Diplomatic posts
Preceded by Ricardo Alarcón	Permanent Representative of Cuba to the United Nations; 1992–1993	Succeeded by Fernando Remírez de Estenoz
