= Jorge Bolaños =

Cuban politician and diplomat

- Born: November 7, 1936 (age 89); Las Tunas, Cuba

Jorge Alberto Bolaños Suarez (born 7 November 1936 in Las Tunas, Cuba) is a Cuban politician and diplomat.

Bolanos graduated in Political Sciences and International Law from the University of Havana and did postgraduate courses in Foreign Relations from the University of London.

Ambassador Bolanos has been a member of the Cuban Foreign Ministry since 1963. He has served as ambassador to Poland (1971–1974), Czechoslovakia (1974–1977), United Kingdom (1977–1981), Brazil (1986–1995) and Mexico (2001–2007). From 2007 to 2012, he served as head of the Cuban Interests Section in Washington, D.C., and since 1981 he has served as First Vice Minister of the Cuban Foreign Ministry.

During his stay in Mexico, he is known to have had close links with Venezuelan diplomat Livia Acosta Noguera, who was later transferred to Peru and afterwards to Miami to serve as consul, and in December 2011 she appeared conspiring against the U.S. in a documentary made by the Spanish language TV Network UNIVISION called "The Iranian Threat". On January 29, 2012, one of the students from the University of Mexico UNAM publicly stated that Ambassador Bolanos was conspiring with Livia Acosta against the U.S., and Ambassador Bolanos continues to enjoy diplomatic immunity in the U.S.

He is married to Graciela Maria Queral-Queral.

== References and external links ==
- The Miami Herald; "Veteran Cuban Diplomat Being Sent to Post in US" by Pablo Bachelet; November 7, 2007
- https://web.archive.org/web/20080314074050/http://www.cubaminrex.cu/English/Ministry/Curriculum_viceministro_bolanos.htm
- https://web.archive.org/web/20110517173638/http://www.cubanet.org/CNews/y05/mar05/31o6.htm
- https://web.archive.org/web/20080504233509/http://cubapolidata.com/tag/intelligence/
- United States Department of State
- Interview made by ORVEX - Organization of Venezuelans in Exile which reveals that Ambassador Bolanos was conspiring against the U.S. while he was in Mexico: http://www.ustream.tv/recorded/20104274

Preceded by Dagoberto Rodríguez Barrera	Chief of Cuban Interests Section; 2007–2012	Succeeded by Jose R. Cabañas Rodriguez
