= Alfonso Fraga =

Cuban diplomat

Alfonso Fraga Pérez
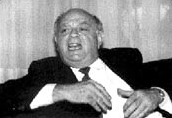
- Born: 1941 (age 84–85); Havana, Cuba

Alfonso Fraga Pérez (born 1941 in Havana) is a Cuban attorney and diplomat.

He has been the secretary general of the Organization of Solidarity with the People of Asia, Africa and Latin America since 2006. He was the Cuban ambassador to Chile from 2000 to 2006, and the chief of the Cuban Interests Section in Washington, D.C., from 1992 to 1998. He has also worked in Cuban embassies in Yugoslavia, China, Poland, East Germany and Zimbabwe. He served as the head of the Cuban Foreign Ministry's European Department.

He is married to Isolina Elisa Gómez Rodríguez (born 1942) and has three children, Alfonso, Rosario, and Leonor Fraga Gómez and five grandchildren. He is the brother-in-law of the Cuban writer and attorney, Clemente Guillermo Gómez Rodríguez.

Preceded by José Antonio Arbesú	Chief of Cuban Interests Section; 1992–1998	Succeeded by Fernando Remírez de Estenoz
