= José Antonio Arbesú =

Cuban diplomat (1940–2020)

José Antonio Arbesú Fraga (21 June 1940 – September 26, 2020) was a Cuban diplomat. Arbesu was born in Havana, and served as the chief of the Cuban Interests Section in Washington, D.C., from 1989 to 1992.

Preceded by Ramón Sánchez-Parodi Montoto	Chief of Cuban Interests Section; 1989–1992	Succeeded by Alfonso Fraga
