= Perucho Figueredo =

Cuban musician (1818–1870)

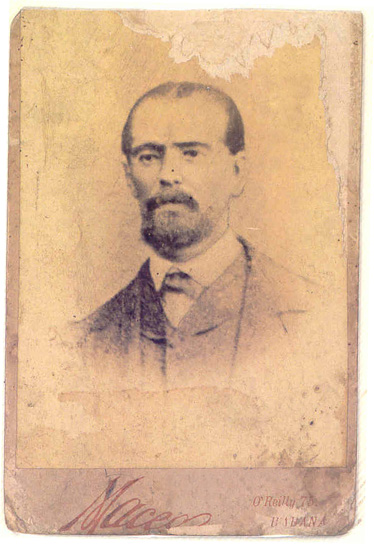
- Postcard of Perucho Figueredo, c 1860s
- Born: 18 February 1818; Bayamo, Cuba
- Died: 17 August 1870 (aged 52); Oriente Province, Cuba

Pedro Felipe Figueredo (18 February 1818 – 17 August 1870), mostly known as Perucho, was a Cuban poet, musician, and freedom fighter of the 19th century. In the 1860s, he was active in the planning of the Cuban uprising against the Spanish known as the Ten Years' War.

Figueredo was born in Bayamo, Cuba. He wrote the Cuban national anthem, El Himno de Bayamo, in 1867. He was captured during the war and executed on 17 August 1870 in Santiago de Cuba.

His daughter Candelaria Figueredo became a hero of the uprising by carrying the new independent Cuban flag into battle at Bayamo in 1868.
