= Dagoberto Rodríguez Barrera =

Cuban diplomat

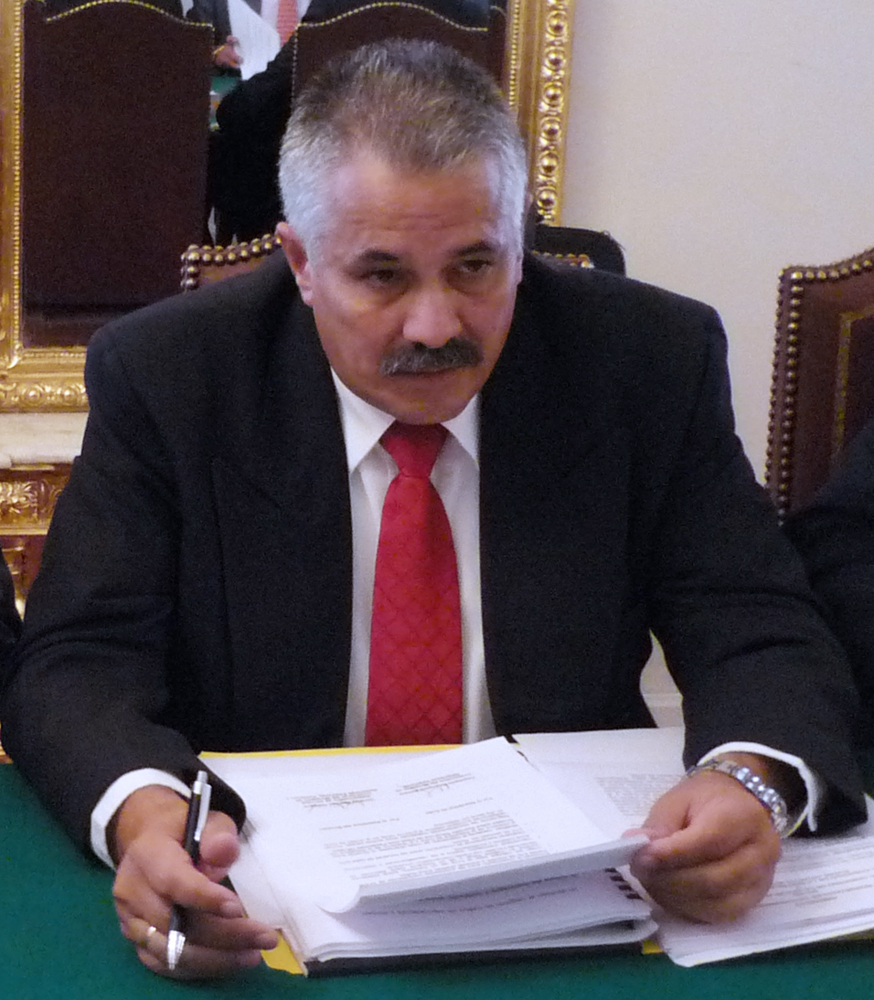
2010

Dagoberto Rodríguez Barrera (born 1955 in Cuba) is a Cuban diplomat. From August 2001 to 2007, he was the Chief of the Cuban Interests Section. Prior to being the Chief of the Cuban Interests Section he was the Head of the Cuban Foreign Ministry's Department on North America. He is currently the Cuban Ambassador in Venezuela.

Preceded by Fernando Remírez de Estenoz	Chief of Cuban Interests Section; 2001–2007	Succeeded by Jorge Bolaños
