= Gustavo Cuervo Rubio =

Cuban physician and politician

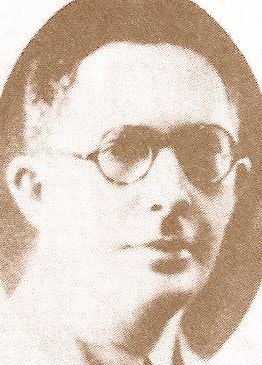
- Born: 6 December 1890; Pinar del Río, Cuba
- Died: 3 April 1978 (aged 87); Miami, Florida, United States

Gustavo Cuervo Rubio (6 December 1890 – 3 April 1978) was a Cuban physician and politician.

== Government service ==
Cuervo served as Vice President of Cuba from 1940 to 1944. He was an unsuccessful candidate for the vice presidency in the 1936 election. He later served as Minister of Foreign Affairs during the presidency of Ramón Grau from 1944 to 1948. He was a signatory of Cuba's 1940 Constitution.

== Personal life ==
Cuervo was married to Conchita Fernández. They had one child, Gustavo Cuervo, Jr. He was the grandfather of Gustavo Cuervo III.
