= Roberto Agramonte =

Cuban philosopher and politician (1904–1995)

Minister of Foreign Affairs
- In office 6 January 1959 – 12 June 1959
- President: Manuel Urrutia Lleó
- Preceded by: Gonzalo Güell
- Succeeded by: Raúl Roa García

Ambassador of Cuba to Mexico
- In office 1948–1947

Personal details
- Born: 3 May 1904 Villa Clara, Cuba
- Died: 12 December 1995 (aged 91) San Juan, Puerto Rico
- Party: PPC-O
- Spouse: Concha María de la Concepción del Río y Madueño
- Children: 2
- Education: University of Havana
- Nickname: Masaboba

Roberto Daniel Agramonte y Pichardo (3 May 1904 – 12 December 1995) was a philosopher and Cuban politician.

== Education and career ==
He graduated from the University of Havana School of Law. Dr. Agramonte was also the Dean of School of Philosophy and Letters at the University of Havana. From 1947 to 1948, he was the Ambassador of Cuba to Mexico. In 1948, he returned to Cuba to run for Vice-President of Cuba with Dr. Eduardo Chibás (as President), but the election was won by Carlos Prio Socarras.

He was the first Foreign Minister after the Cuban Revolution. He later resigned because of the Communist tilt of the government. In May 1960, he left Cuba for Puerto Rico with his family.

== Personal life ==
He was the son of Frank Agramonte and María Pichardo y Pichardo. He was married to Concha María de la Concepción del Río y Madueño and they had two children, Roberto and Conchita Agramonte-del Rio.

== Publications ==
- La biología de la democracia (1927),
- Programa de filosofía moral (1928),
- Tratado de psicología general: un estudio sistemático de la conducta humana, 2t, (1935, 1959);
- Biografía del dictador García Moreno (1935) (premiada),
- El pensamiento filosófico de Varona (1935);
- Varona, el filósofo del escepticismo creador (1938, 1949) (premiada),
- Varona: Su vida, su obra y su influencia (Investigación compartida con Elías Entralgo y Medardo Vitier);
- Sociología (1947, 1949).
- José A. Caballero y los orígenes de la conciencia cubana (1952),
- Sociología de la Universidad (1950, 1958),
- Mendieta Nuñez y su magisterio sociológico (1961);
- Sociología contemporánea (1963);
- Sociología latinoamericana (1963);
- Principios de sociología: un libro para latinoamericanos (1965);
- Martí y su concepción del mundo (1971);
- Sociología: Curso Introductorio (1972, 1978);
- Martí y su concepción de la sociedad Parte I (1979), Parte II (1984);

Political offices
Preceded by Gonzalo Güell	Foreign Minister of Cuba; 1959	Succeeded by Raúl Roa García
