= Alberto Inocente Álvarez =

Cuban lawyer, diplomat, and politician

Personal details
- Born: December 28, 1906 San Antonio de las Vegas, Cuba
- Died: February 6, 1985 (aged 78) Miami, Florida
- Spouse: Fausta Azpiazu
- Children: Maria Isabel Alvarez Azpiazu, Alberto Inocente Alvarez Azpiazu
- Education: University of Havana School of Law, New York University
- Profession: Lawyer, diplomat, politician
- Portfolio: Minister of Commerce, Foreign Minister, Prime Minister

Alberto Inocente Álvarez Cabrera (December 28, 1906 – February 6, 1985) was a Cuban lawyer, diplomat, and politician.

Alvarez graduated from the University of Havana School of Law in 1930 and then studied accounting at New York University.

During the regime of Gerardo Machado, he was involved in the Directorio Estudantil and was imprisoned. He served in the Constitutional Assembly of 1940. Elected to the Cuban House of Representatives in 1940. Elected to the Cuban Senate in 1944. Appointed Minister of Commerce (1944–1945) and then Foreign Minister 1945–1948. In 1950 he was elected to the Senate for the province of Pinar del Rio, and became Majority Whip.

Then went on to serve as the Cuban Ambassador to Mexico and then as the Cuban Representative to the United Nations. The position of President of the United Nations Security Council is a monthly, rotating position; he was President of the UNSC in March 1949.

He had many financial holdings both in and outside Cuba, but left when Fulgencio Batista overthrew President Carlos Prio Socarras in 1952. He left permanently in 1959. He first went to Costa Rica later moving to Miami, Florida, and after to Spain and back to Costa Rica.

He was married twice, first to Lidia Fajardo and then to Fausta Aspiazu Garcia. He had two children, Alberto Inocente Alvarez Azpiazu, Maria Isabel Alvarez Azpiazu

He was a member of the Vedado Tennis Club and the Havana Biltmore Yacht and Country Club.

Political offices
| Preceded by Gustavo Cuervo Rubio | Foreign Minister of Cuba; 1945-1948 | Succeeded by Carlos Hevia |
