= Miguel A. Suárez Fernández =

Cuban lawyer and politician

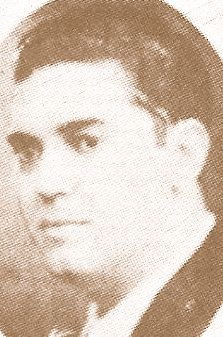

President of the Senate of Cuba
- In office 12 December 1945 – 6 October 1950
- Preceded by: Eduardo Suárez Rivas
- Succeeded by: Manuel Antonio de Varona

Personal details
- Born: 2 July 1902 Placetas, Cuba

Miguel Angel Suárez Fernández (born 5 July 1902 in Placetas, Cuba) was a Cuban lawyer and politician. He served as the Cuban Foreign Minister in 1951.

== Biography ==
Suárez was the son of Miguel Ángel Suárez Gutiérrez, who a Cuban Senator from the Las Villas Province and had served as Secretary of Commerce during the presidency of Carlos Mendieta. He graduated from the Colegio de Belén in 1920 and later from the University of Havana School of Law.

He was the Registrar of Properties for the city of Guanabacoa and later went on to serve in the Cuban House of Representatives and the Cuban Senate for Las Villas province. He served as the President of the Cuban Senate from 1945 to 1950. He was a signatory of Cuba's 1940 Constitution.

After Fidel Castro overthrew the government in 1959, Suárez went into exile: First to Venezuela, then to Puerto Rico and finally to Miami.

Political offices
Preceded by Ernesto Dihigo y Lopez Trigo	Foreign Minister of Cuba; 1951	Succeeded by Óscar Gans
