= Antonio Rodríguez Ferrer =

Cuban musician (1864–1935)

- Born: 23 August 1864; Havana, Cuba
- Died: 22 October 1935 (aged 71); Havana, Cuba

Antonio Rodríguez Ferrer (August 23, 1864 – October 22, 1935) was a Cuban composer and band conductor.

In 1898, he became composer of the musical introductory notes to the Cuban national anthem. He was a professor of music and conducted choirs and bands. Besides composing music for bands, he composed two symphonies, Preludio Tematico and Fantasia, and a series of Danzas Cubanas for piano. In 1918, he was awarded the prize for music by the National Academy of Arts and Letters. His nephew, Jorge Gustavo Armando Rodriguez Gonzalez (1889–1966) was also a composer/musician and his great-grandnephew is the writer/lawyer Clemente G. Gomez Rodriguez.
