= Gonzalo Güell =

Cuban politician (1895–1985)

13th Prime Minister of Cuba
- In office March 12, 1958 – January 1, 1959
- President: Fulgencio Batista
- Preceded by: Emilio Núñez
- Succeeded by: José Miró

Foreign Minister of Cuba
- In office 1956–1959
- Preceded by: Carlos Saladrigas
- Succeeded by: Roberto Agramonte

Personal details
- Born: February 16, 1895 Havana, Cuba
- Died: September 2, 1985 (aged 90) Coral Gables, Florida, U.S.

Gonzalo Güell y Morales de los Ríos (February 16, 1895, in Havana, Cuba – September 2, 1985, in Coral Gables, Florida, U.S.) was a Cuban lawyer and a career diplomat (1919–1959).

== Career ==
Güell was Foreign Minister of Cuba from 1956 to 1959 and Prime Minister of Cuba from March 12, 1958, to January 1, 1959. He also served as the Cuban Ambassador to Mexico, Colombia, Brazil, Norway and the United Nations.

He was one of the 40 persons that flew with Fulgencio Batista to the Dominican Republic on New Year's Eve 1959 when Fidel Castro took over Cuba.

== Personal life ==
He was married three times. Two of his wives were Francisca Pubill and Juana Inigo. He had one daughter.
