= La Bayamesa =

National anthem of Cuba

Himno de Bayamo
English: 'Bayamo Anthem'
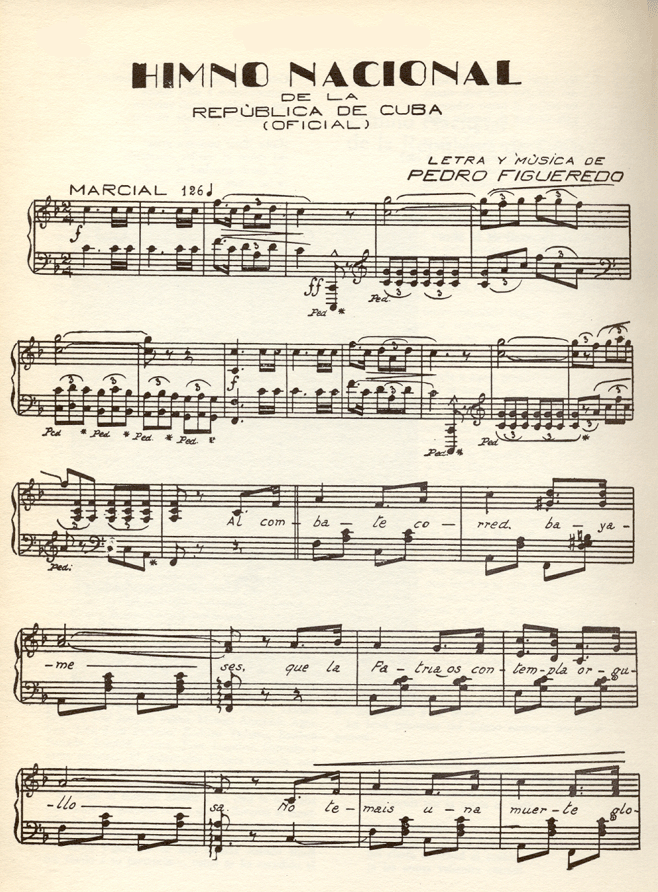
- National anthem of Cuba
- Also known as: "La Bayamesa" (English: 'The Bayamo Song'); Himno Nacional de Cuba (English: National Anthem of Cuba)
- Lyrics: Perucho Figueredo
- Music: Perucho Figueredo and Antonio Rodríguez Ferrer, 1867
- Adopted: 1902
- Readopted: 1909
- Relinquished: 1906

Audio sample
- Instrumental rendition in E-flat major: file; help

"La Bayamesa" (/ˌbaɪəˈmɛsə/ BY-ə-MESS-ə, Spanish: [la βaʝaˈmesa]), officially known as "Himno de Bayamo" ('Bayamo Anthem'), is the national anthem of Cuba. It was first performed in 1868, during the Battle of Bayamo. Perucho Figueredo, who took part in the battle, wrote the lyrics to the anthem, and he, along with Antonio Rodríguez Ferrer, composed the melody of "La Bayamesa" in 1868.

== Overview ==
U.S. Navy Band instrumental version (with repeat)
Older arrangement featuring a repeat of the second half of the verse

On October 20, 1868, the Cuban forces obtained the capitulation of the Spanish colonial authorities in Bayamo, the jubilant people surrounded Figueredo and asked him to write an anthem with the melody they were humming. Right on the saddle of his horse, Figueredo wrote the lyrics of the anthem, which was longer than the current official version. Figueredo was captured and executed by the Spanish two years later. Just before the firing squad received the Fire command, Figueredo shouted the line from his song: "Morir por la Patria es vivir" ('To die for the homeland is to live').

Officially adopted by Cuba as its national anthem in 1902 on the foundation of the Republic, it was retained even after the revolution of 1959. The Cuban composer Antonio Rodríguez-Ferrer contributed the opening notes of the anthem.

In addition to the "Himno de Bayamo", there are two other well-known Cuban songs called "La Bayamesa". The first Bayamesa was composed in 1851 by Carlos Manuel de Céspedes and José Fornaris at the request of their friend Francisco Castillo Moreno, who is sometimes also credited with the lyrics. After 1868, during the Cuban war, a "mambí" version of "La Bayamesa" became popular. It has the same melody but different lyrics. Many years later, in 1918, the composer and trovador Sindo Garay, from Santiago de Cuba, composed a song he called "Mujer Bayamesa"; popular usage shortened the title to "La Bayamesa".

== Lyrics ==
Originally, the song had three verses. The last two were excluded when the anthem was officially adopted in 1902, because the lyrics were seen to be excessively anti-Spanish and too long compared with the other verses.

Spanish original

¡Al combate, corred, bayameses!,
Que la patria os contempla orgullosa;
No temáis una muerte gloriosa,
Que morir por la patria es vivir.
(𝄆) En cadenas vivir es vivir
En afrenta y oprobio sumido.
Del clarín escuchad el sonido:
¡A las armas, valientes, corred! (𝄇)

No temáis los feroces íberos,
Son cobardes cual todo tirano.
No resisten al bravo cubano;
Para siempre su imperio cayó.
(𝄆) ¡Cuba libre! Ya España murió,
Su poder y su orgullo ¿do es ido?
¡Del clarín escuchad el sonido:
¡A las armas, valientes, corred! (𝄇)

Contemplad nuestras huestes triunfantes,
Contempladlos a ellos caídos.
Por cobardes huyeron vencidos;
¡Por valientes, sabemos triunfar!
(𝄆) ¡Cuba libre! podemos gritar
Del cañón al terrible estampido.
¡Del clarín escuchad el sonido:
¡A las armas, valientes, corred! (𝄇)

IPA transcription

[al kom.ˈba.te ko.ˈreð ba.ʝa.ˈme.ses ǀ]
[ke la ˈpa.tɾja‿o kon.tem.ˈpla‿oɾ.ɣu.ˈʝo.sa ǀ]
[no te.ˈmajs ˈu.na ˈmweɾ.te ɣlo.ˈɾjo.sa ǀ]
[ke mo.ˈɾiɾ poɾ la ˈpa.tɾja‿ez‿βi.ˈβiɾ ‖]
(𝄆) [eŋ‿ka.ˈðe.naz‿βi.ˈβiɾ ez‿βi.ˈβiɾ]
[en a.ˈfɾen.ta‿j‿o.ˈpɾo.bjo su.ˈmi.ðo ‖]
[del kla.ˈɾin es.ku.ˈt͡ʃað el so.ˈni.ðo ‖]
[a las ˈaɾ.maz‿βa.ˈljen.tes ko.ˈreð ‖] (𝄇)

[no te.ˈmajz‿los fe.ˈɾo.ses ˈi.βe.ɾos ǀ]
[soŋ‿ko.ˈβaɾ.ðes kwal ˈto.ðo ti.ˈɾa.no ‖]
[no re.ˈsis.ten al ˈbɾa.βo ku.ˈβa.no ‖]
[ˈpa.ɾa ˈsjem.pɾe su‿im.ˈpe.ɾjo ka.ˈjo ‖]
(𝄆) [ˈku.βa ˈli.βɾe ʝa‿es.ˈpa.ɲa mu.ˈɾjo ǀ]
[su po.ˈðeɾ i su‿oɾ.ˈɣu.ʝo ðo‿es ˈi.ðo ‖]
[del kla.ˈɾin es.ku.ˈt͡ʃað el so.ˈni.ðo ‖]
[a las ˈaɾ.maz‿βa.ˈljen.tes ko.ˈreð ‖] (𝄇)

[kon.tem.ˈplað ˈnwes.tɾas ˈwes.tes tɾjuɱ.ˈfan.tes ǀ]
[kon.tem.ˈplað.los a‿ˈe.ʝos ka.ˈi.ðos ‖]
[poɾ ko.ˈβaɾ.ðes u.ʝe.ˈɾom‿ben.ˈsi.ðos ‖]
[poɾ βa.ˈljen.tes sa.ˈβe.mos tɾjuɱ.ˈfaɾ ‖]
(𝄆) [ˈku.βa ˈli.βɾe po.ˈðe.moz‿ɣɾi.ˈtaɾ]
[del ka.ˈɲon al te.ˈri.βl(e)‿es.tam.ˈpi.ðo ‖]
[del kla.ˈɾin es.ku.ˈt͡ʃað el so.ˈni.ðo ‖]
[a las ˈaɾ.maz‿βa.ˈljen.tes ko.ˈreð ‖] (𝄇)

English translation

To combat, run, people of Bayamo!
Because the Fatherland proudly looks at you;
Fear not a glorious death,
Because dying for the Fatherland is living.
(𝄆) Living in chains is living
Plunged in affront and opprobrium.
Hear the sound of the bugle:
To arms, brave ones, run! (𝄇)

Fear not the fierce Iberians,
They are cowards like every tyrant.
They cannot withstand the brave Cubans;
Their empire has forever fallen.
(𝄆) Free Cuba! Spain has already died,
Its power and pride, where did it go?
Hear the sound of the bugle:
To arms, brave ones, run! (𝄇)

Behold our triumphant troops,
And behold them fallen.
Because they were cowards, they flee defeated;
Because we were brave, we knew how to triumph.
(𝄆) Free Cuba! we can shout
From the cannon's terrible boom.
Hear the sound of the bugle,
To arms, brave ones, run! (𝄇)
