= José Manuel Cortina =

Cuban politician, lawyer and journalist

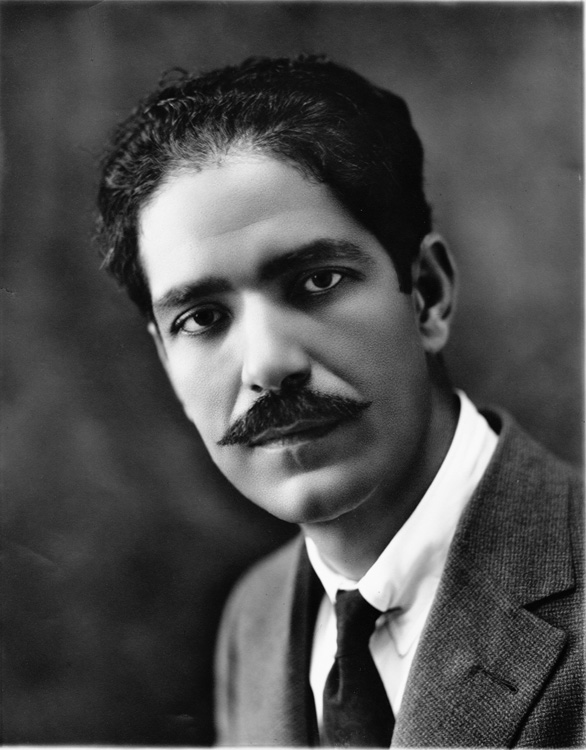
- José Manuel Cortina

Foreign Minister of Cuba
- In office 1936-1937; 1940-1942
- President: Miguel Mariano Gómez; Fulgencio Batista

Secretary of the Presidency
- In office ?
- President: Alfredo Zayas y Alfonso

Member of the Cuban Senate
- In office ?

Member of the Cuban House of Representatives
- In office 1908-?

Personal details
- Born: 3 February 1880; San Diego de Nuñez, Pinar del Río, Cuba
- Died: 9 March 1970 (aged 90); Miami, Florida, USA
- Spouses: María Josefa Corrales; Adela Ramírez y Blanco; Leocadia de la Concepción de Verna y Peñes
- Children: 7
- Occupation: Politician, lawyer

José Manuel de Cortina y García (Spanish pronunciation: [xoˈse manˈwel koɾˈtinaj ɣaɾˈsi.a]; 3 February 1880 in San Diego de Nuñez, Pinar del Río, Cuba – 9 March 1970 in Miami, Miami-Dade County, Florida USA) was a Cuban politician, lawyer and journalist.

== Biography ==
Cortina was the son of Constantino de Cortina y Arteaga, an agriculturalist of Basque descent, and wife María Luisa García y Gutiérrez.

He graduated from the Colegio de Belén (1898) and graduated as a lawyer in 1903. He wrote for Democracia, El Mundo, La Lucha, La Revista de Derecho, and La Nación.

Cortina was first elected to public office in 1908 as a member of the Cuban House of Representatives and was later elected to the Cuban Senate. He served as Secretary of the Presidency under Alfredo Zayas y Alfonso. In 1927, he was the Cuban delegate to the League of Nations. He was Cuba's Foreign Minister from 1936–1937 under the presidency of Miguel Mariano Gómez and again from 1940–1942 under the presidency of Fulgencio Batista. Cortina was instrumental in the elimination of the Platt Amendment in the early 1930s and served as President of the coordinating committee under Carlos Márquez Sterling at the convention that created the 1940 Constitution of Cuba. Among his many publications he is best known for his work "Ideales Internacionales de Cuba" (Cuba's International Ideals).

José Manuel de Cortina y García is considered one of Cuba's most outstanding orators and diplomats. He had two large haciendas one in Arroyo Naranjo the other, La Güira in Pinar del Río, which housed a rural public school. His family also had property in Camagüey Province. All of his property was confiscated by the government of Fidel Castro. One of his properties, Las Cuevas de los Portales, located in La Palma in Pinar del Río; confiscated by the Cuban Revolution in 1959 was declared a Cuban National Monument in 1987.

== Family ==
He married his first wife, María Josefa Corrales (1880-1962) who went by the name Josefa. José and Josefa had four children: Ofelia (1901-1972), Esther (1902-1994), José Manuel Jr. (1904-1978), and Humberto (1908-1960).

He later married Adela Ramírez y Blanco (1898-1992), his second wife, and they had a son Aníbal. Aníbal (1931-2010) married Elena Lavin y Corominas and together they had six children, Aníbal José, María Elena, José Antonio (deceased), Jorge Alberto, Ana María and Ignacio Agustín. Aníbal has sixteen grandchildren. Aníbal retired from a successful career as an economist and lawyer for The Organization of American States (OAS).

His childhood sweetheart was Leocadia de la Concepción de Verna y Peñes (December 9, 1893 - 1982). Leocadia was nicknamed "Cheche". José and Cheche had two children, a daughter, Judith (1912–2005), and a son Aquiles (1916–1962). Judith de Verna Cortina married Mario Milian and had one daughter, Judith Marty née Milian (founder and principal of Mater Academy Charter School). Aquiles married Daisy Breton and had one child, a daughter, Daisita. Other famous descendants of José Manuel Cortina include Nestor Carbonell, Aileen Marty, Elena Marty-Nelson, and Bernie Aquiles Cueto.
