= Aurelio Hevia =

Cuban politician

Aurelio Hevia y Alcalde
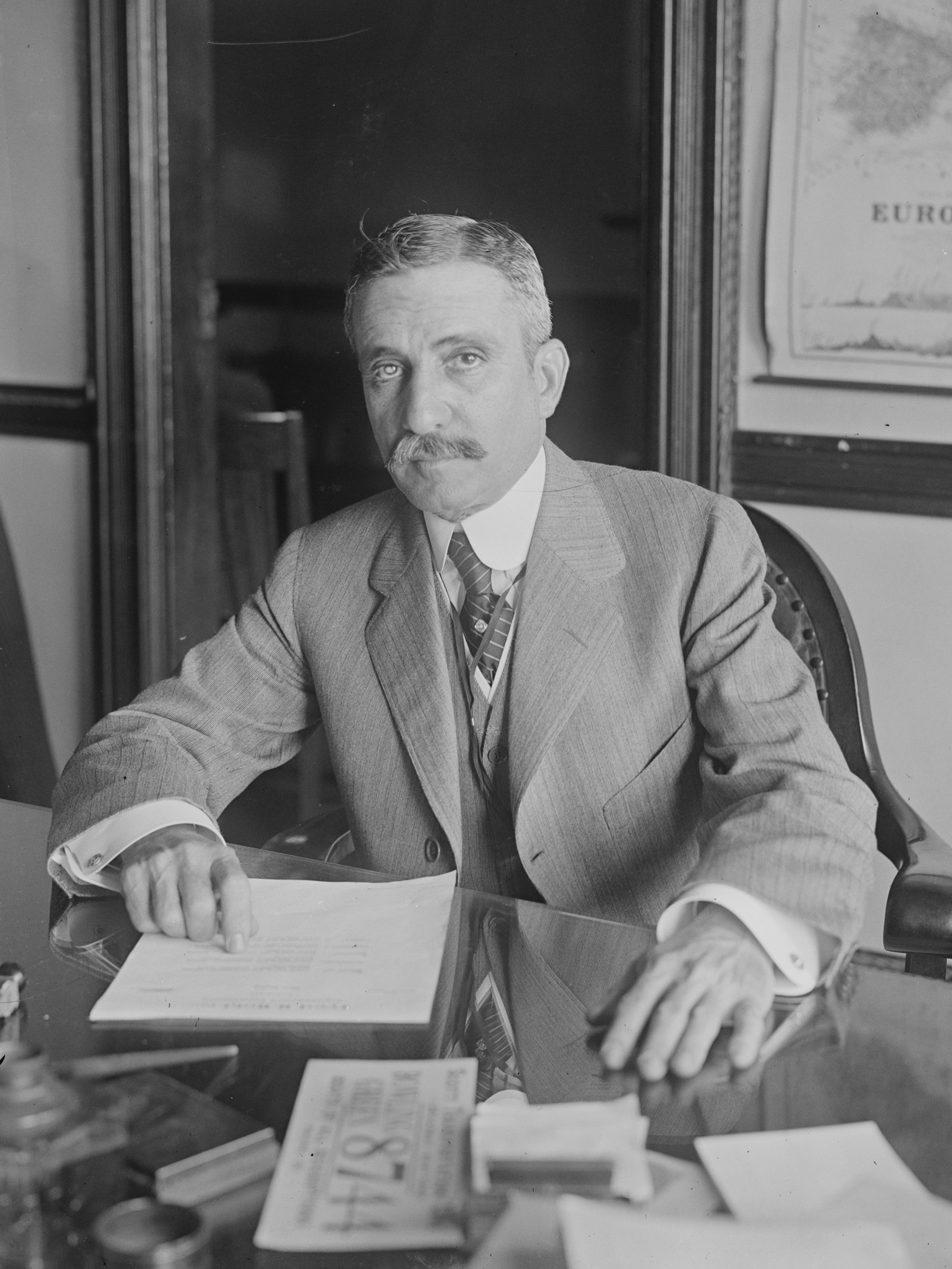

Cuban Secretary of the Interior
- Appointed by: Mario García Menocal

Personal details
- Born: October 25, 1866 Havana, Cuba
- Died: January 22, 1945 (aged 78) Havana, Cuba

Aurelio Crispin Francisco Hevia y Alcalde (October 25, 1866 - January 22, 1945) was a colonel in the Cuban Revolution and was the Cuban Secretary of Interior.

== Biography ==
During the administration of Mario García Menocal he was appointed as the Cuban Secretary of Interior.

In 1931 he was imprisoned at La Cabaña for opposing the new president.

His son served as President of Cuba for three days, from January 15, 1934, to January 18, 1934.

He died on January 22, 1945.
