= Miguel Ángel de la Campa y Caraveda =

Cuban diplomat, lawyer and author

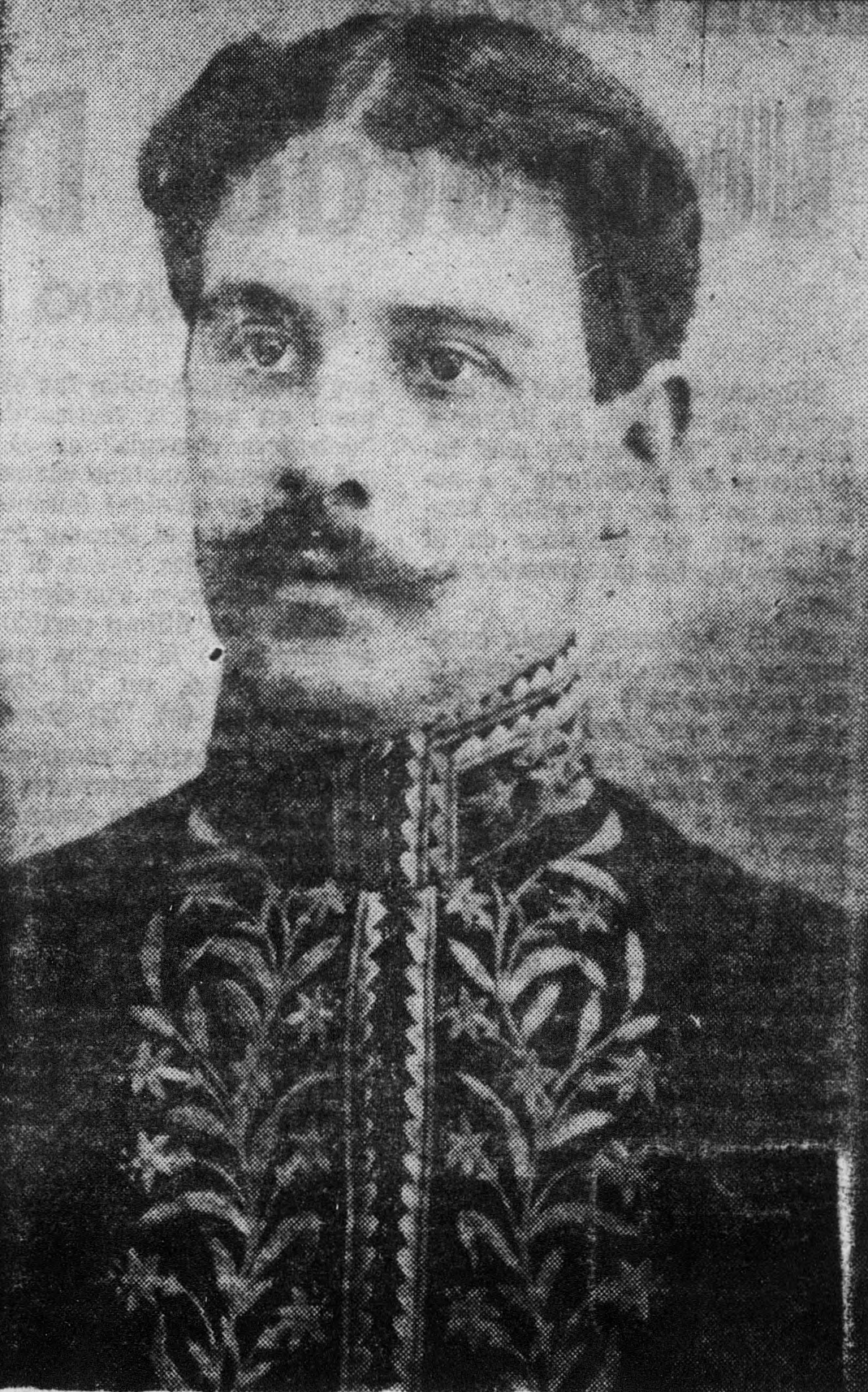
- Born: 8 December 1882; Havana, Cuba
- Died: 19 August 1965 (aged 82); Miami, Florida

Miguel Ángel de la Campa y Caraveda (8 December 1882 – 19 August 1965) was a Cuban diplomat, lawyer and author.

Campa was the son of Spaniards Miguel Angel de la Campa-Alvarodiaz and Maria Teresa Caraveda. He graduated from the Colegio de Belen in 1900 and later the University of Havana School of Law.

He served in the Cuban diplomatic corps from 1906 to 1958. He served as the Cuban Ambassador to Spain, Italy, Mexico, Japan, and the United Nations. He was the Cuban Foreign Minister twice, first from 1937 to 1940, and then from 1952 to 1955. He also served as the Cuban Attorney General and he was the Cuban Ambassador in the United States (1955–1958). In March 1958, he was appointed Cuba’s Minister of Defense. In January 1959, after the fall of Batista’s government, he and his family received asylum at the Chilean Embassy in Cuba; they emigrated from Cuba in March 1959. He received decorations from over 35 countries, such as the Legion of Honor from France and the Order of Isabella the Catholic from Spain.

He was married to Maria Teresa Roff (died 7 December 1952) on 12 December 1907 at the Church of St. Honorato in Paris, France, and they had five children: Maria Teresa (1917-) (married first to Guillermo de Zendegui and then to Luis Andres Vargas Gomez), Miguelina (1919-) (married to Octavio A. Averhoff), Berta (1911–1999), Miguel Ángel (1922–1984), and Alberto de la Campa y Roff (1918–1964). They lived at Calle 27 #557 in Vedado, Havana, Cuba.

Political offices
Preceded by Juan Jose Remos y Rubio	Foreign Minister of Cuba; 1937–1940	Succeeded by Jose Manuel Cortina
Preceded by Aureliano Sanchez Arango	Foreign Minister of Cuba; 1952–1955	Succeeded by Andrés Domingo y Morales del Castillo
