= Raúl Roa García =

Cuban politician (1907–1982)

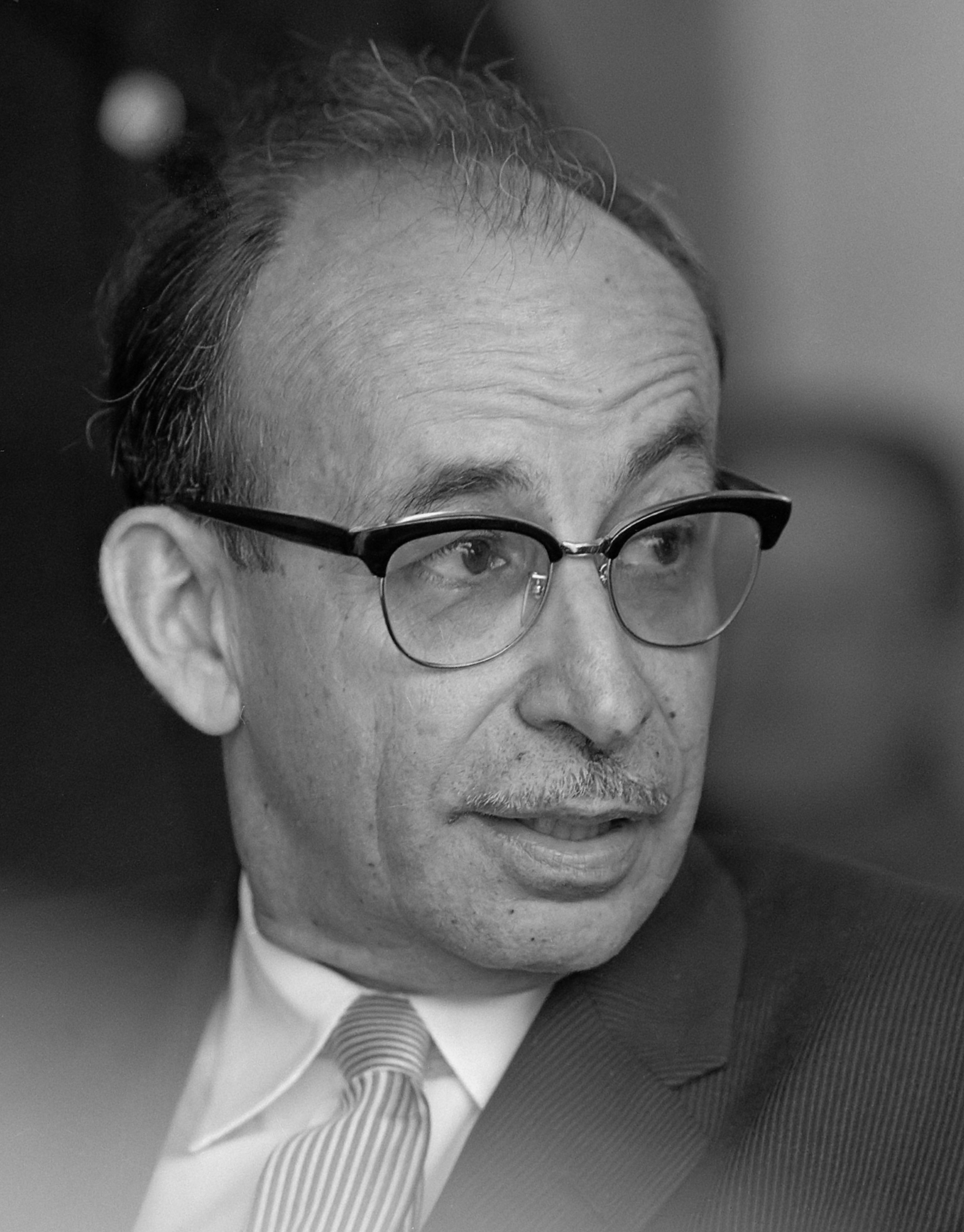
- Roa in 1961

Foreign Minister of Cuba
- In office 17 July 1959 – 2 December 1976
- President: Osvaldo Dorticós Torrado
- Prime Minister: Fidel Castro
- Preceded by: Roberto Agramonte
- Succeeded by: Isidoro Malmierca Peoli

Personal details
- Born: 18 April 1907 Havana, Cuba
- Died: 6 July 1982 (aged 75) Havana, Cuba
- Party: Communist Party of Cuba
- Spouse: Ada Kourí
- Children: Raúl Roa-Kourí
- Parent(s): Raúl Roa; María Luisa García
- Occupation: Writer, politician, diplomat and professor

Raúl Roa García (18 April 1907 – 6 July 1982) was a Cuban intellectual, politician and diplomat. He served as Foreign Minister of Cuba from 1959 to 1976. He was a lawyer and was also a university professor in the 1940s and 1950s. He was also Director of Culture of the Ministry of Education from 1949 to 1951.

Born in Havana, he was 18 when he wrote his first article Ensayo sobre José Martí ("Essay on Jose Marti"). In 1926, while studying law he was jailed for protesting the U.S. intervention in Nicaragua.

In 1927, he met Rubén Martínez Villena who instructed him more on social problems. Additionally, he participated with other anti-imperialist youths and revolutionaries at Universidad Popular José Martí and the Liga Antimperialista. He was also writing for the magazine Revista de Avance and the weekly paper Otro.

In the 1930s, he wrote for Directorio Estudiantil Revolucionario where he crystallized his Marxist-Leninist beliefs.

Roa entered the Ala Izquierda Estudiantil in 1931. In this organization, much more radical, he positions himself more clearly on the necessity of the fight for the sovereignty of Cuba and against imperialism. His writings at this time reflect his firm idea in an armed rebellion. He is arrested and sent to prison.

He left prison in 1933 and wrote Manifiesto al pueblo de Cuba. He participated in the general strike of 1933 that led to the ouster of Gerardo Machado. In March 1935, he was exiled to the United States. There he united with people such as Pablo de la Torriente Brau and founded the organization, Organización Revolucionaria Cubana Antiimperialista (ORCA).

He kept good relations with other Latin American countries and also signed an anti-hijacking agreement with the United States in 1973.

He died in Havana on July 6, 1982. He was married to Dr. Ada Kouri Barreto. Their son, Raúl Roa Kouri, is also a diplomat and has served as Cuba's ambassador to the Holy See and Cuba's representative to the United Nations. His grandfather was Lieutenant Coronel Ramón Roa Gari of the Cuban Liberation Army.

Political offices
Preceded by Roberto Agramonte y Pichardo	Foreign Minister of Cuba; 1959–1976	Succeeded by Isidoro Malmierca Peoli
