= Óscar Gans =

Cuban politician

Óscar B. Gans
- Born: 12 May 1903; Havana, Cuba
- Died: 7 December 1965 (aged 62); Mexico City, Mexico

Óscar B. Gans y López Martínez (12 May 1903 – 7 December 1965) was a Cuban attorney and politician. He served as Foreign Minister and later as Prime Minister of Cuba during the administration of Carlos Prio.

He was married to Sara María Gutiérrez and they had one child, Manuel Gans Gutiérrez.

Political offices
| Preceded by Félix Lancís | Prime Minister of Cuba; 1 October 1951 – 10 March 1952 | Succeeded by Fulgencio Batista |
| Preceded by Miguel A. Suárez Fernández | Foreign Minister of Cuba; 1951 | Succeeded by Aureliano Sánchez Arango |
