= Ernesto Dihigo =

Cuban jurist, diplomat, and professor (1896–1991)

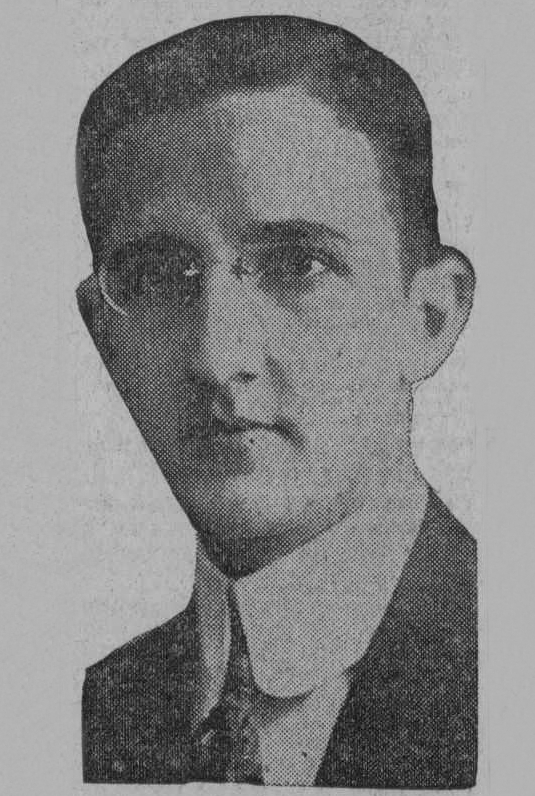

Cuban Ambassador to the United States
- In office February 25, 1959 – January 3, 1961
- Preceded by: Nicolas Arroyo
- Succeeded by: José Ramón Cabañas Rodríguez (2015)

Personal details
- Born: 23 January 1896 Havana, Cuba
- Died: 1991 (aged 94–95) Miami, Florida
- Spouse: Caridad Larrondo

Ernesto Dihigo y López Trigo (23 January 1896 – 1991) was a prominent Cuban jurist, diplomat, and professor. He served as the Cuban Foreign Minister during the administration of the presidency of Carlos Prio Socarras from 1950 to 1951. He served as the Cuban Ambassador to the United States from January 1959 until January 1961 after the regime of Fulgencio Batista was overthrown by Fidel Castro.

Dihigo was a member of the Cuban Supreme Court in 1943 and served as a delegate to the United Nations. He served on the commission that wrote the 1948 Universal Declaration of Human Rights. Dihigo's draft declaration was among the first considered when the U.N. Commission on Human Rights began work in 1946. He also pushed successfully for the Organization of American States to adopt its own American Declaration of the Rights and Duties of Man and to establish an inter-American human-rights court.

From 1917 he was associated with the University of Havana beginning as a student. He served as Professor of Roman Law until 1960. In September 1955 he was a member of the Buraimi Arbitration Tribunal sitting in Geneva to adjudicate on a territorial dispute in south-eastern Arabia. Together with the British representative and chairman on the tribunal he resigned in protest over Saudi tactics before the tribunal made a final decision.

In 1989, he travelled from his home in Havana to Miami and was given a luncheon by the Colegio de Abogados de La Habana en el Exilio.

He was married to Caridad Larrondo. They lived at Calle 46 #116, esquina 3 Avenue, Miramar, Havana, Cuba. He died in Miami, Florida, in 1991.

Political offices
Preceded by Carlos Hevia	Foreign Minister of Cuba; 1950–1951	Succeeded by Miguel A. Suárez Fernández
Preceded by Nicolas Arroyo	Cuban Ambassador to the United States; 1959–1961	Succeeded by Embassy Closed, José Ramón Cabañas Rodríguez (2015)
