= History of Cuba =

The island of Cuba was inhabited by various Indigenous cultures prior to the arrival of the explorer Christopher Columbus in 1492. After his arrival, Spain conquered Cuba and appointed Spanish governors to rule in Havana. The administrators in Cuba were subject to the Viceroy of New Spain and the local authorities in Hispaniola. In 1762–63, Havana was briefly occupied by Britain, before being returned to Spain in exchange for Florida. A series of rebellions between 1868 and 1898, led by General Máximo Gómez, failed to end Spanish rule and claimed the lives of 49,000 Cuban guerrillas and 126,000 Spanish soldiers. However, the Spanish–American War resulted in a Spanish withdrawal from the island in 1898, and following three and a half years of subsequent US military rule, Cuba gained formal independence in 1902.

In the years following its independence, the Cuban republic saw significant economic development, but also political corruption and a succession of despotic leaders, culminating in the overthrow of the dictator Fulgencio Batista by the 26th of July Movement, led by Fidel Castro, during the 1953–1959 Cuban Revolution. The new government aligned with the Soviet Union and embraced communism. (Note: Cuba was officially atheist from 1962 until 1992.) In the early 1960s, Castro's regime withstood invasion, faced nuclear Armageddon, (Note: Massive quantities of advanced Soviet military hardware, including batteries of surface-to-air missiles, flowed to the island, and in October 1962 the Cuban Missile Crisis occurred.) and experienced a civil war that included Dominican support for regime opponents. (Note: After Dominican dictator Rafael Trujillo formed an anti-Castro foreign legion of 3,000 soldiers-of-fortune, including 200 Cuban exiles and 400 Spanish volunteers from the Blue Division (which had fought for Germany on the Eastern Front during WWII), Castro sponsored or organized several attempts to unseat him. On 14 June 1959, approximately 200 Dominican exiles and Cuban revolutionaries launched an invasion of the Dominican Republic from Cuba with the hope of overthrowing the Trujillo regime. Trujillo's forces quickly routed the invaders. A week later, another group of invaders in 2 yachts were intercepted and blasted by mortar fire and bazookas from the shore. Trujillo's planes, directed by his son Ramfis, commander of the air force, zoomed low over the yachts and shot rockets, killing most of the invaders. A few survivors managed to swim to the shore and escape into the forest; the military used napalm to get them out. The leaders of the invasion were taken aboard a Dominican Air Force plane and then pushed out in mid-air, falling to their deaths. Trujillo responded by supporting an October 1960 uprising in the Escambray Mountains by 1,000 Cuban counter-revolutionaries. The rebels were defeated and their leader, William Morgan, was captured and executed.) Following the Warsaw Pact invasion of Czechoslovakia (1968), Castro publicly declared Cuba's support. His speech marked the start of Cuba's complete absorption into the Eastern Bloc. During the Cold War, Cuba also supported Soviet policy in Afghanistan, Poland, Angola, Ethiopia, Nicaragua, and El Salvador. The Cuban economy was mostly supported by Soviet subsidies.

With the dissolution of the USSR in 1991 Cuba was plunged into a severe economic crisis known as the Special Period that ended in 2000 when Venezuela began providing Cuba with subsidized oil. The country has been politically and economically isolated by the United States since the Revolution, but has gradually gained access to foreign commerce and travel as efforts to normalise diplomatic relations have progressed. Domestic economic reforms are also beginning to tackle existing economic problems which arose in the aftermath of the special period (i.e. the introduction of the dual currency system).

== Pre-Columbian (to 1500) ==
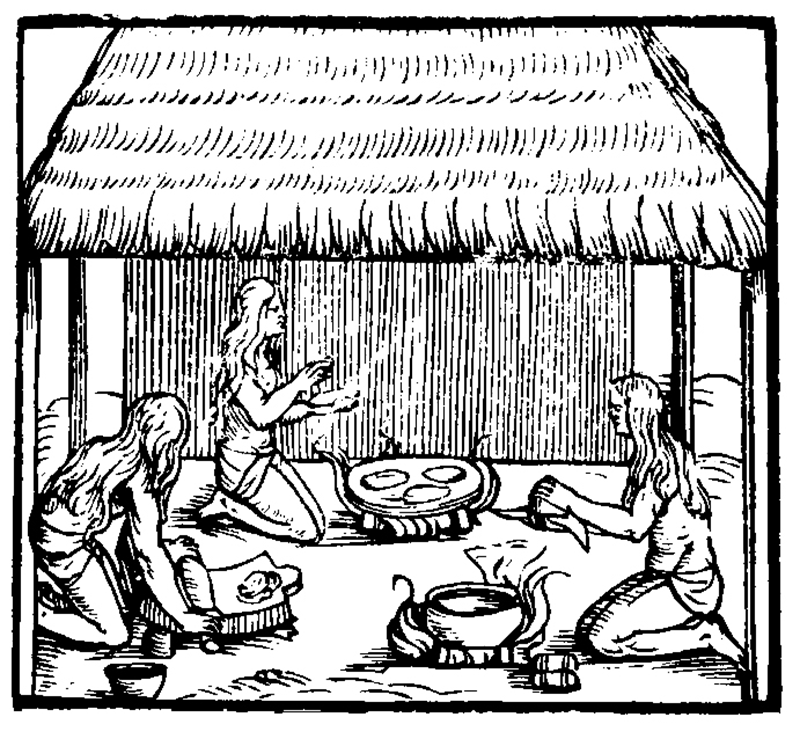
Taíno women preparing cassava bread

Cuba's earliest known human inhabitants inhabited the island in the 4th millennium BC. The oldest known Cuban archeological site, Levisa, dates from approximately 3100 BC. A wider distribution of sites date from after 2000 BC, most notably represented by the Cayo Redondo and Guayabo Blanco cultures of western Cuba. These neolithic cultures used ground stone and shell tools and ornaments, including the dagger-like gladiolitos. The Cayo Redondo and Guayabo Blanco cultures lived a subsistence lifestyle based on fishing, hunting and collecting wild plants.

The Indigenous Guanajatabey, who had inhabited Cuba for centuries, were driven to the far west of the island by the arrival of subsequent waves of migrants, including the Taíno and Ciboney. These people had migrated north along the Caribbean island chain. The Taíno and Ciboney were part of a cultural group commonly called the Arawak, who inhabited parts of northeastern South America prior to the arrival of Europeans. Initially, they settled at the eastern end of Cuba, before expanding westward across the island. The Spanish Dominican clergyman and writer Bartolomé de las Casas estimated that the Taíno population of Cuba had reached 350,000 by the end of the 15th century. The Taíno cultivated the yuca root, harvested it and baked it to produce cassava bread. They also grew cotton and tobacco, and ate maize and sweet potatoes.

== Spanish conquest ==
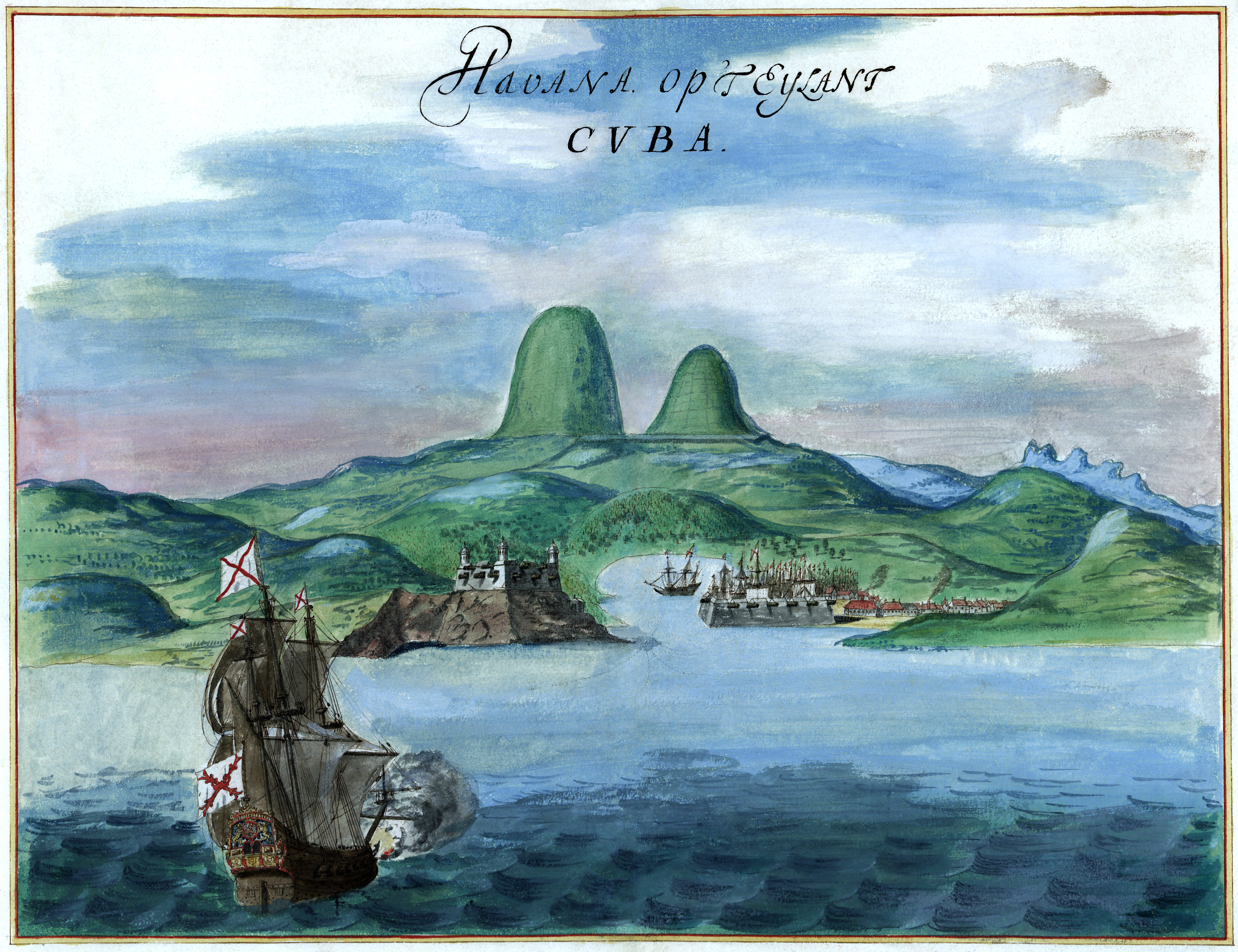
A watercolor painting of Havana Bay, c. 1639

Christopher Columbus, on his first Spanish-sponsored voyage to the Americas in 1492, sailed south from what is now the Bahamas to explore the northeast coast of Cuba and the northern coast of Hispaniola. Columbus, who was searching for a route to India, believed the island to be a peninsula of the Asian mainland. Columbus arrived at Cuba on October 27, 1492, and he landed on October 28, 1492, at Puerto de Nipe.

During a second voyage in 1494, Columbus passed along the south coast, landing at various inlets including what was to become Guantánamo Bay. With the Papal Bull of 1493, Pope Alexander VI commanded Spain to conquer and convert the pagans of the New World to Catholicism. The Spanish began to create permanent settlements on the island of Hispaniola, east of Cuba, soon after Columbus' arrival in the Caribbean, but the coast of Cuba was not fully mapped by Europeans until 1508, by Sebastián de Ocampo. In 1511, Diego Velázquez de Cuéllar set out from Hispaniola to form the first Spanish settlement in Cuba, with orders from Spain to conquer the island. The settlement was at Baracoa, but the new settlers were greeted with stiff resistance from the local Taíno population. The Taínos were initially organized by cacique (chieftain) Hatuey, who had himself relocated from Hispaniola to escape Spanish rule. After a prolonged guerrilla campaign, Hatuey and successive chieftains were captured and burnt alive, and within three years the Spanish had gained control of the island. In 1514, a south coast settlement was founded in what was to become Havana. The current city was founded in 1519.

Clergyman Bartolomé de las Casas observed a number of massacres initiated by the invaders, notably the massacre near Camagüey of the inhabitants of Caonao. According to his account, some three thousand villagers had traveled to Manzanillo to greet the Spanish with food, and were "without provocation, butchered". The surviving Indigenous groups fled to the mountains or the small surrounding islands before being captured and forced into reservations. One such reservation was Guanabacoa, today a suburb of Havana.

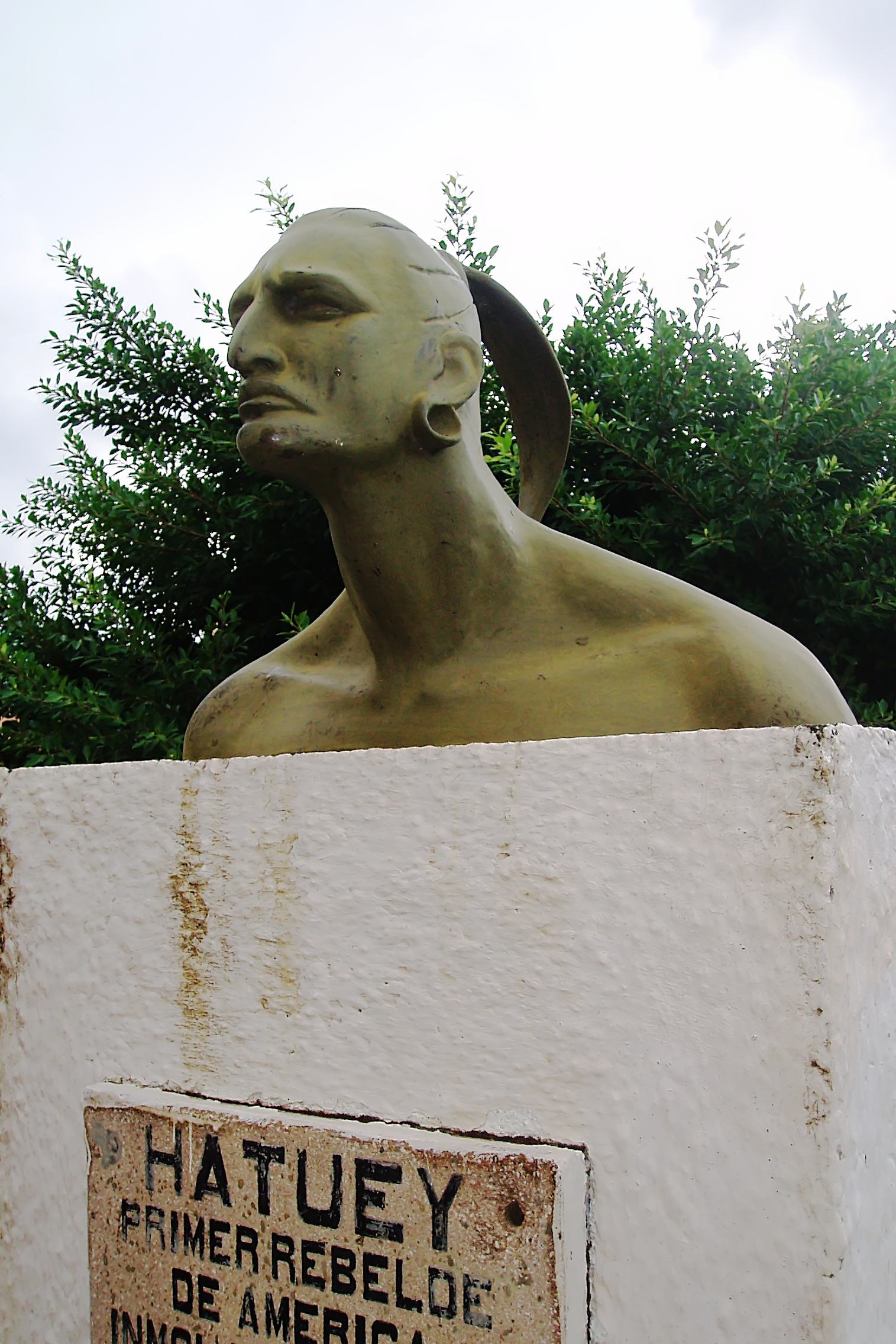
A monument to the Taíno chieftain Hatuey in Baracoa, Cuba

In 1513, Ferdinand II of Aragon issued a decree establishing the encomienda land settlement system that was to be incorporated throughout the Spanish Americas. Velázquez, who had become Governor of Cuba, was given the task of apportioning the land and the Indigenous peoples to groups throughout the new colony. The scheme was not a success, however, as the natives either succumbed to diseases brought from Spain such as measles and smallpox, or simply refused to work, preferring to move into the mountains. Desperate for labor for the new agricultural settlements, the Conquistadors sought slaves from surrounding islands and the continental mainland. Velazquez's lieutenant Hernán Cortés launched the Spanish conquest of the Aztec Empire in Mexico from Cuba, sailing from Santiago to the Yucatán Peninsula. However, these new arrivals also dispersed into the wilderness or died of disease.

Despite the difficult relations between the natives and the new Europeans, some cooperation was in evidence. The Spanish were shown by the Natives how to nurture tobacco and consume it as cigars. There were also many unions between the largely male Spanish colonists and Indigenous women. Modern studies have revealed traces of DNA that renders physical traits similar to Amazonian tribes in individuals throughout Cuba, although the native population was largely destroyed as a culture and civilization after 1550. Under the Spanish New Laws of 1552, Indigenous Cuban were freed from encomienda, and seven towns for Indigenous peoples were set up. There are Indigenous descendant Cuban (Taíno) families in several places, mostly in eastern Cuba. The local Indigenous population also left their mark on the language, with some 400 Taíno terms and place-names surviving to the present day. For example, Cuba and Havana were derived from Classic Taíno, and Indigenous words such as tobacco, hurricane and canoe were transferred to English.

== Colonial period ==
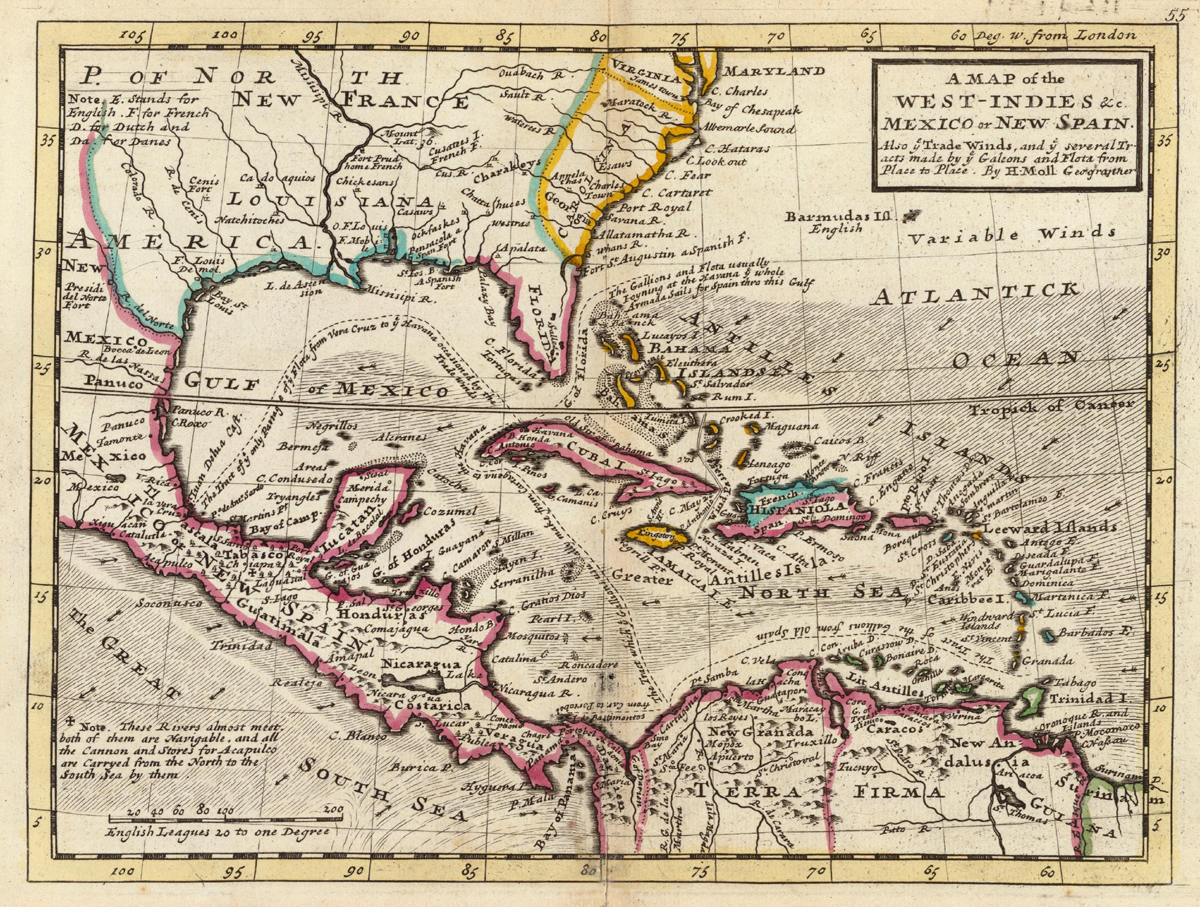
A 1736 colonial map by Herman Moll of the West Indies and Mexico, together comprising "New Spain", with Cuba visible in the center

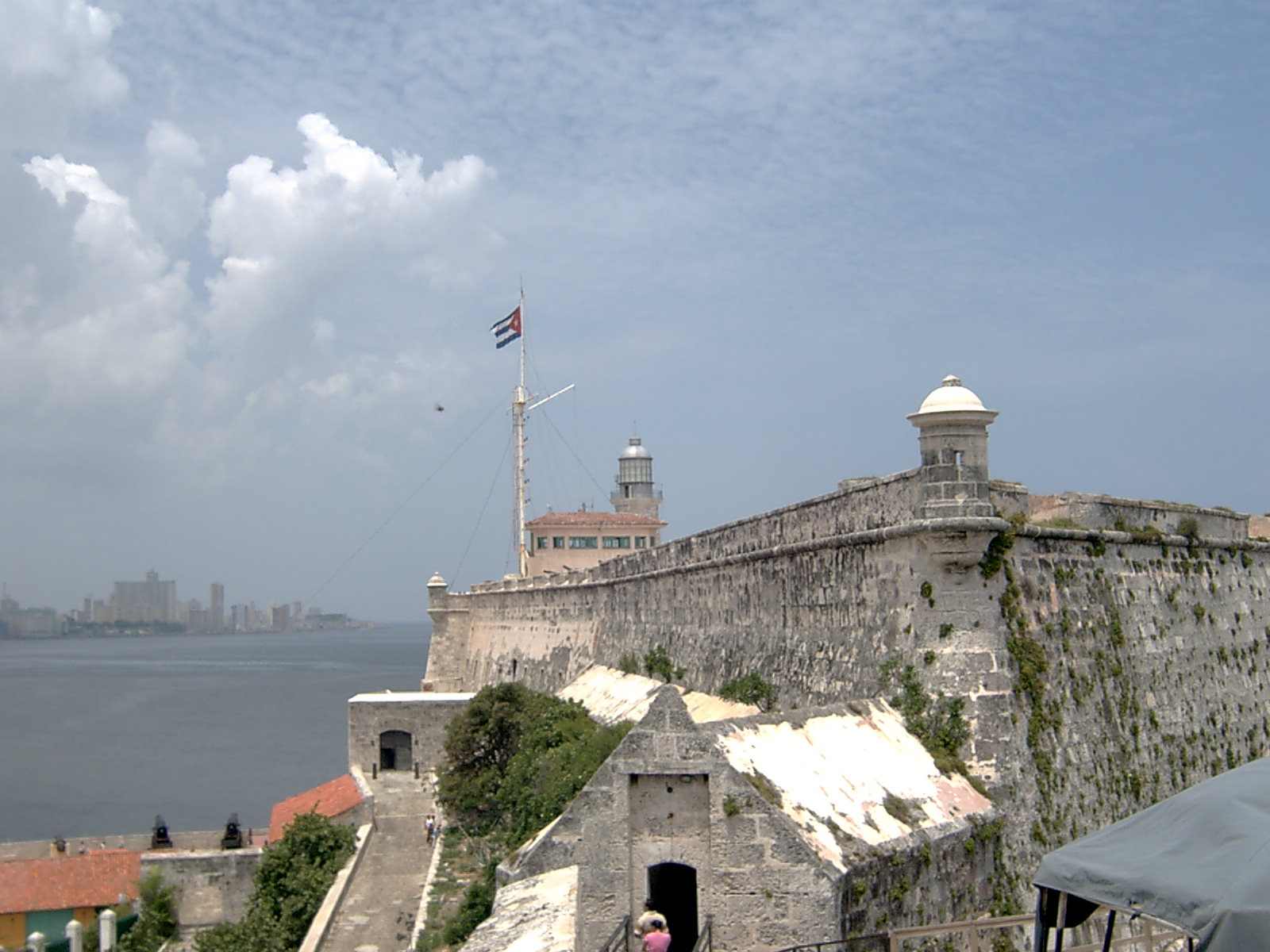
The fortress of El Morro in Havana, built in 1589

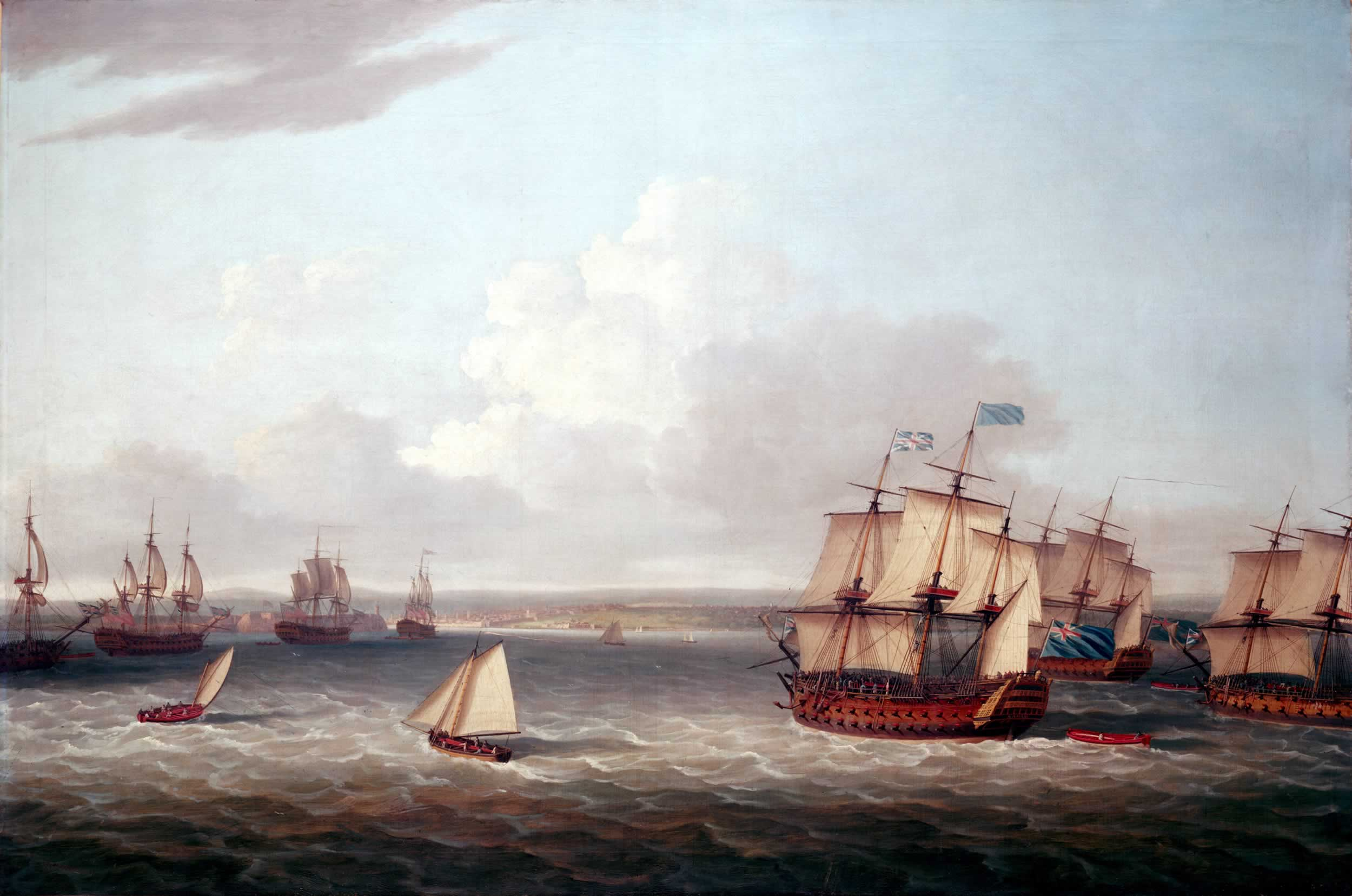
The British Fleet Entering Havana, 21 August 1762, a 1775 painting by Dominic Serres

The Spanish established sugar and tobacco as Cuba's primary products, and the island soon supplanted Hispaniola as the prime Spanish base in the Caribbean. African slaves were imported to work the plantations as field labor. However, restrictive Spanish trade laws made it difficult for Cubans to keep up with the 17th and 18th century advances in processing sugar cane until the Haitian Revolution saw French planters flee to Cuba. Spain also restricted Cuba's access to the slave trade, instead issuing foreign merchants asientos to conduct it on Spain's behalf, and ordered regulations on trade with Cuba. The resultant stagnation of economic growth was particularly pronounced in Cuba because of its great strategic importance in the Caribbean, and the stranglehold that Spain kept on it as a result. Colonial Cuba was a frequent target of buccaneers, pirates and French corsairs. In response to repeated raids, defenses were bolstered throughout the island during the 16th century. In Havana, the fortress of Castillo de los Tres Reyes Magos del Morro was built to deter potential invaders. Havana's inability to resist invaders was dramatically exposed in 1628, when a Dutch fleet led by Piet Heyn plundered the Spanish ships in the city's harbor. In 1662, Christopher Myngs with a small fleet from Jamaica captured and briefly occupied Santiago de Cuba on the eastern part of the island.

Nearly a century later, the British Royal Navy launched another invasion, capturing Guantánamo Bay in 1741 during the War of Jenkins' Ear. Admiral Edward Vernon saw his 4,000 occupying troops capitulate to raids by Spanish troops, and more critically, an epidemic, forcing him to withdraw his fleet to British Jamaica. In the War of the Austrian Succession, the British carried out unsuccessful attacks against Santiago de Cuba in 1741 and again in 1748. Additionally, a skirmish between British and Spanish naval squadrons occurred near Havana in 1748.

The Seven Years' War, which erupted in 1754 across three continents, eventually arrived in the Spanish Caribbean. In 1762 a British expedition of five warships and 4,000 troops set out from Portsmouth to capture Cuba. The British arrived on 6 June, and by August had Havana under siege. When Havana surrendered, the admiral of the British fleet, George Keppel, entered the city as a new colonial governor and took control of the whole western part of the island. The arrival of the British immediately opened up trade with their North American and Caribbean colonies, causing a rapid transformation of Cuban society. Though Havana, which had become the third-largest city in the Americas, was to enter an era of sustained development and closening ties with North America during this period, the British occupation proved short-lived. Pressure from London sugar merchants fearing a decline in sugar prices forced negotiations with the Spanish over colonial territories. Less than a year after Havana was seized, the Peace of Paris was signed by the three warring powers, ending the Seven Years' War. The treaty gave Britain Florida in exchange for Cuba. In 1781, General Bernardo de Gálvez, the Spanish governor of Louisiana, reconquered Florida for Spain with Mexican, Puerto Rican, Dominican, and Cuban troops. In the 19th century, Cuba became the most important world producer of sugar, thanks to the expansion of slavery and a relentless focus on improving sugar technology. Use of modern refining techniques was especially important because the British Slave Trade Act 1807 abolished the slave trade in the British Empire. The British government set about trying to eliminate the transatlantic slave trade. Under British diplomatic pressure, in 1817 Spain agreed to abolish the slave trade from 1820 in exchange for a payment from London. Cubans rushed to import further slaves in the time legally left to them. Over 100,000 new slaves were imported from Africa between 1816 and 1820. In spite of the new restrictions a large-scale illegal slave trade continued to flourish in the following years. Many Cubans were torn between desire for the profits generated by sugar and a repugnance for slavery. By the end of the 19th century, slavery was abolished.

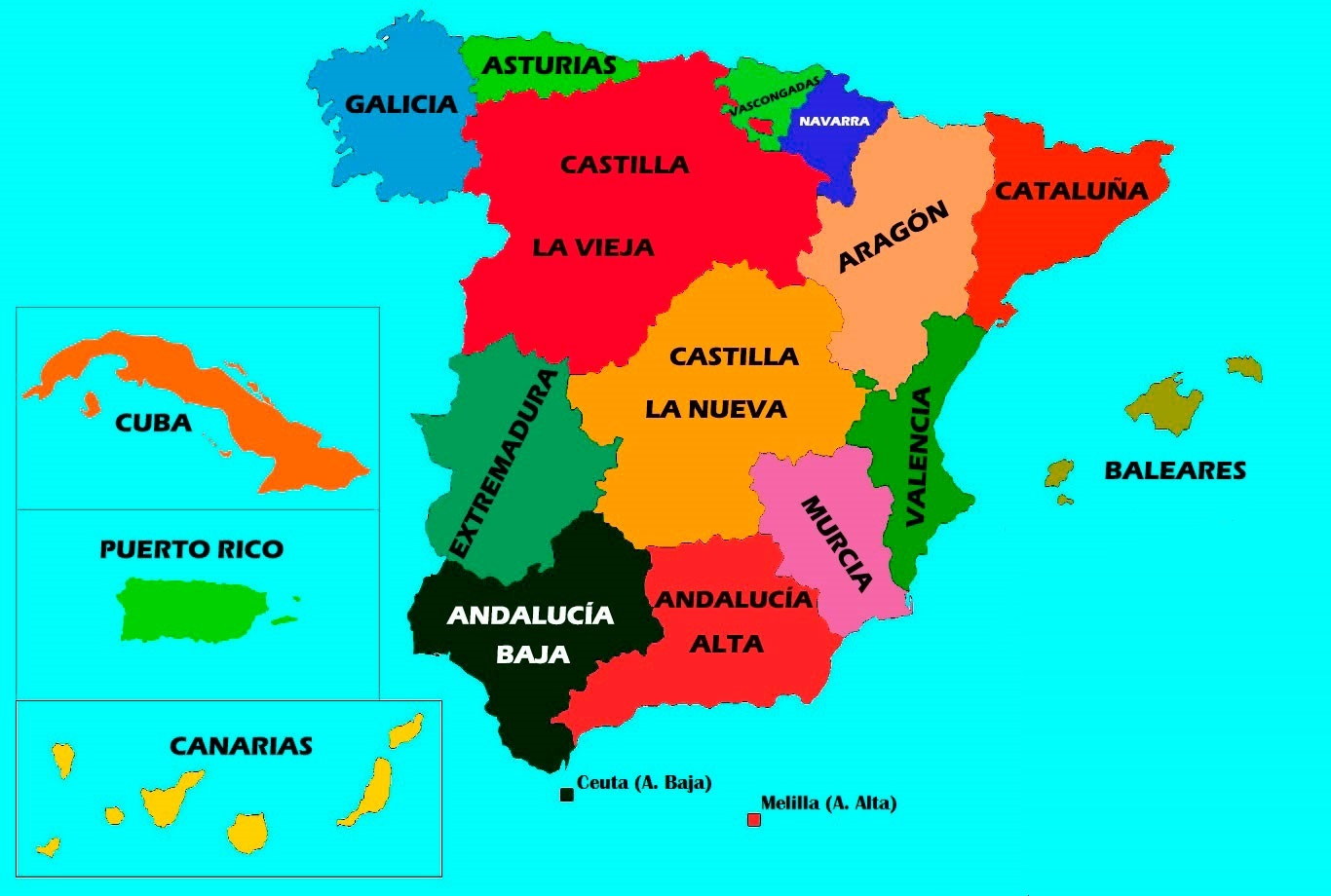
States proposed in the Spanish Draft Federal Constitution of 1873, among which Cuba was included

When Spain opened the Cuban trade ports, it quickly became a popular place. Cubans began to use water mills, enclosed furnaces, and steam engines to produce higher-quality sugar at a much more efficient pace. The boom in Cuba's sugar industry in the 19th century made it necessary for the country to improve its transportation infrastructure. Many new roads were built, and old roads were quickly repaired. Railroads were built relatively early, easing the collection and transportation of perishable sugar cane. By 1860, Cuba was devoted to growing sugar, having to import all other necessary goods. Cuba was particularly dependent on the United States, which bought 82 percent of its sugar. In 1820, Spain abolished the slave trade, hurting the Cuban economy even more and forcing planters to buy more expensive, illegal, and "troublesome" slaves (as demonstrated by the slave rebellion on the Spanish ship Amistad in 1839).

== Reformism, annexation, and independence (1800–1898) ==
In the early 19th century, three major political currents took shape in Cuba: reformism, annexation and independence. Spontaneous and isolated actions added a current of abolitionism. The 1776 Declaration of Independence by the Thirteen Colonies and the successes of the French Revolution of 1789 influenced early Cuban liberation movements, as did the successful revolt of black slaves in Haiti in 1791. One of the first of such movements in Cuba, headed by the free black Nicolás Morales, aimed at gaining equality between "mulatto and whites" and at the abolition of sales taxes and other fiscal burdens. Morales' plot was discovered in 1795 in Bayamo, and the conspirators were jailed.

=== Reform, autonomy and separatist movements ===
As a result of the political upheavals caused by the Iberian Peninsular War of 1807–1814 and of Napoleon's invasion of Spain and the removal of Ferdinand VII from the Spanish throne in 1808, a western separatist rebellion emerged among the Cuban Creole aristocracy in 1809 and 1810. One of its leaders, Joaquín Infante, drafted Cuba's first constitution, declaring the island a sovereign state, presuming the rule of the country's wealthy, maintaining slavery as long as it was necessary for agriculture, establishing a social classification based on skin color and declaring Catholicism the official religion. This conspiracy also failed, and the main leaders were deported. In 1812 a mixed-race abolitionist conspiracy arose, organized by José Antonio Aponte, a free-black carpenter. He and others were executed.

The Spanish Constitution of 1812, and the legislation passed by the Cortes of Cádiz after it was set up in 1808, instituted a number of liberal political and commercial policies, which were welcomed in Cuba but also curtailed a number of older liberties. Between 1810 and 1814 the island elected six representatives to the Cortes, in addition to forming a locally elected Provincial Deputation. Nevertheless, the liberal regime and the Constitution proved ephemeral: Ferdinand VII suppressed them when he returned to the throne in 1814 after Napoleon's total defeat. By the end of the 1810s, some Cubans were inspired by the successes of Simón Bolívar in South America and Mexico's criollo independence movement. Numerous secret-societies emerged, most notably the Bolívarian Suns and Rays Conspiracy, founded in 1821 and led by José Francisco Lemus, associated with Freemasonry in Cuba. It aimed to establish the free Republic of Cubanacán, and it had branches in five districts of the island.

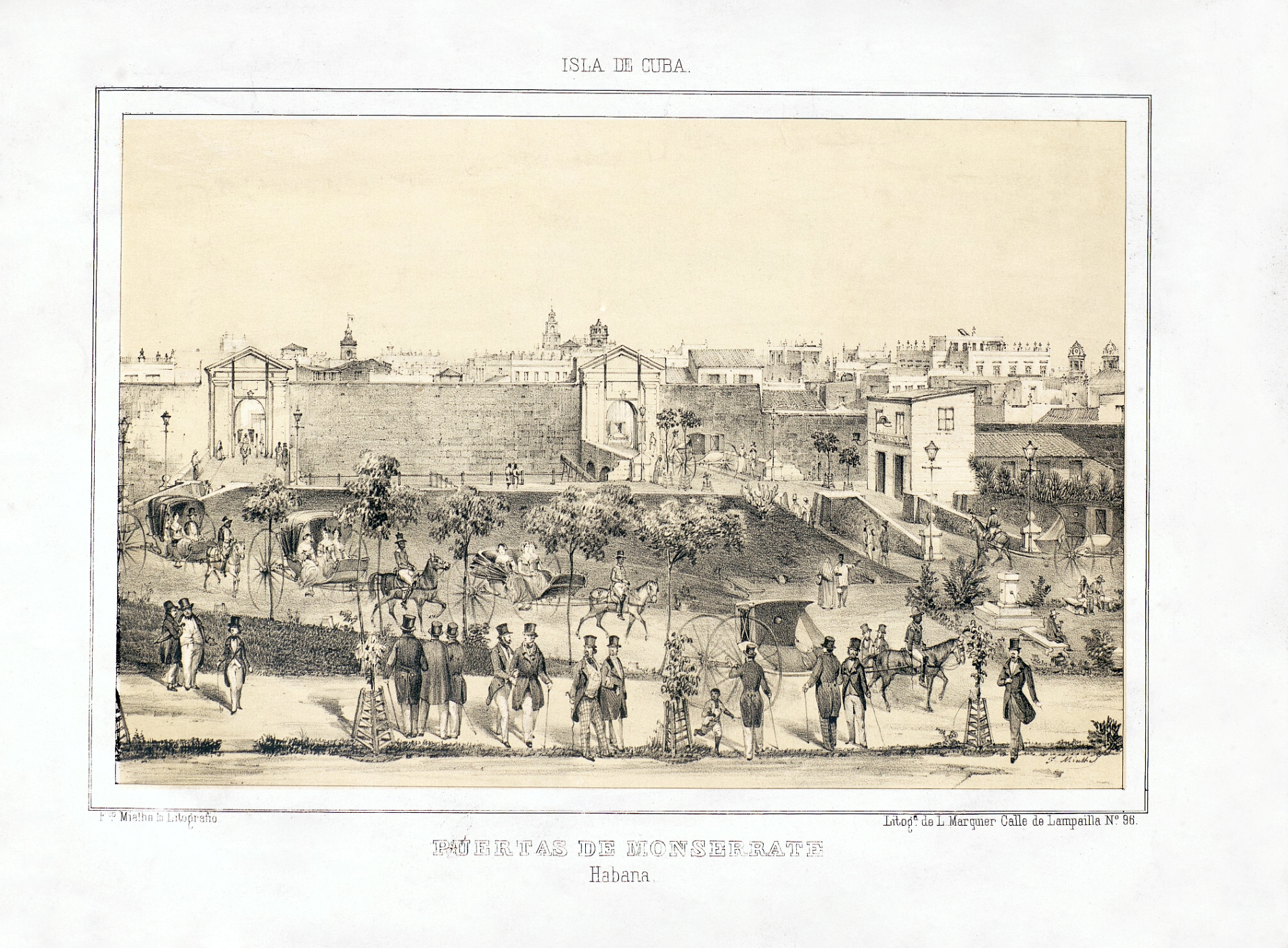
The city walls of Havana, 1848

In 1823 the society's leaders were arrested and condemned to exile. In the same year, King Ferdinand VII abolished constitutional rule in Spain yet again. As a result, the national militia of Cuba, established by the Constitution and a potential instrument for liberal agitation, was dissolved, a permanent executive military commission under the orders of the governor was created, newspapers were closed, elected provincial representatives were removed and other liberties suppressed.

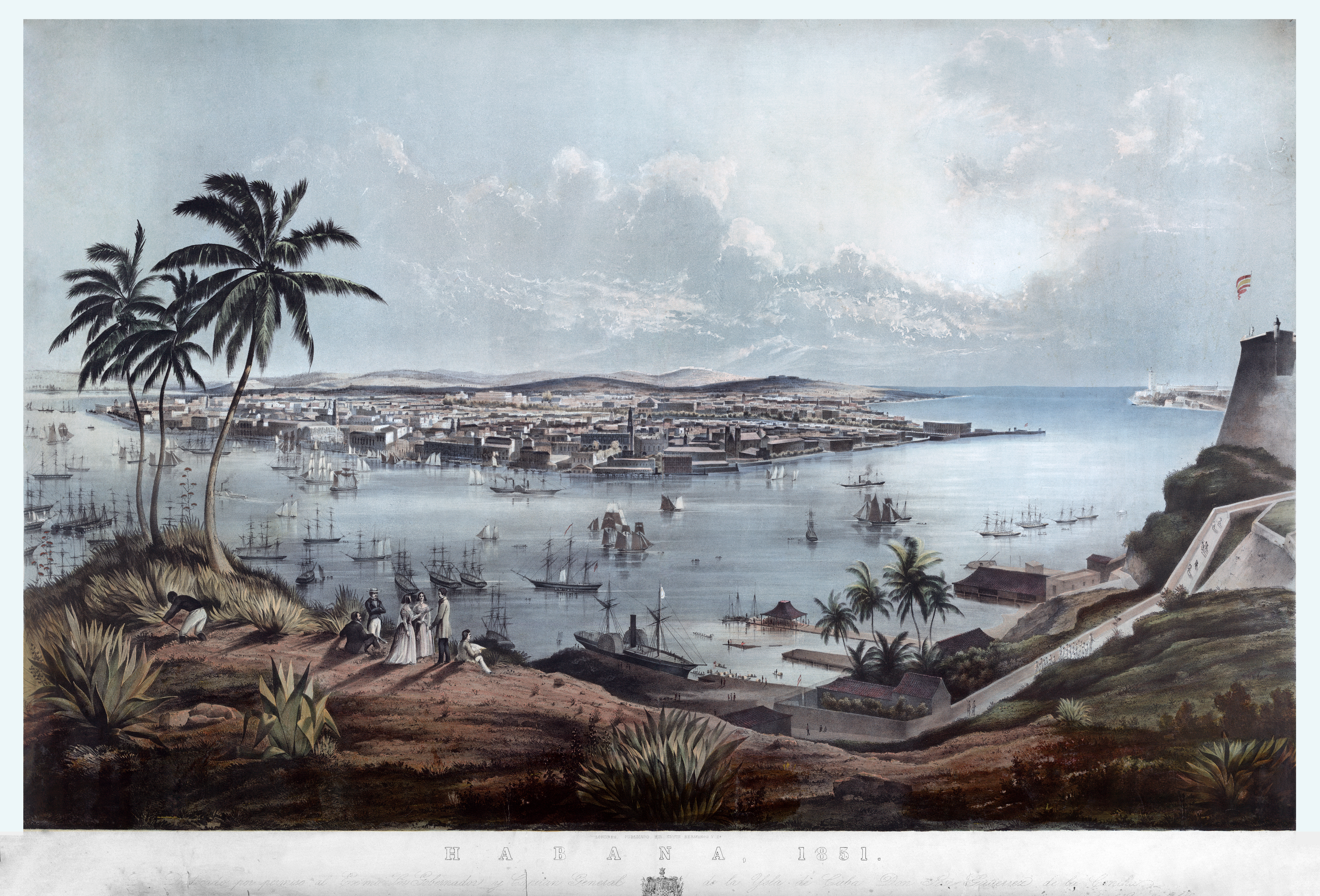
19th century view of Havana

This suppression, and the success of independence movements in the former Spanish colonies on the North American mainland, led to a notable rise of Cuban nationalism. A number of independence conspiracies developed during the 1820s and 1830s, but all failed. Among these were the "Expedición de los Trece" (Expedition of the 13) in 1826, the "Gran Legión del Aguila Negra" (Great Legion of the Black Eagle) in 1829, the "Cadena Triangular" (Triangular Chain) and the "Soles de la Libertad" (Suns of Liberty) in 1837. Leading national figures in these years included Félix Varela and Cuba's first revolutionary poet, José María Heredia.

Between 1810 and 1826, 20,000 royalist refugees from the Latin American Revolutions arrived in Cuba. They were joined by others who left Florida when Spain ceded it to the United States in 1819. These influxes strengthened loyalist pro-Spanish sentiments.

=== Antislavery and independence movements ===
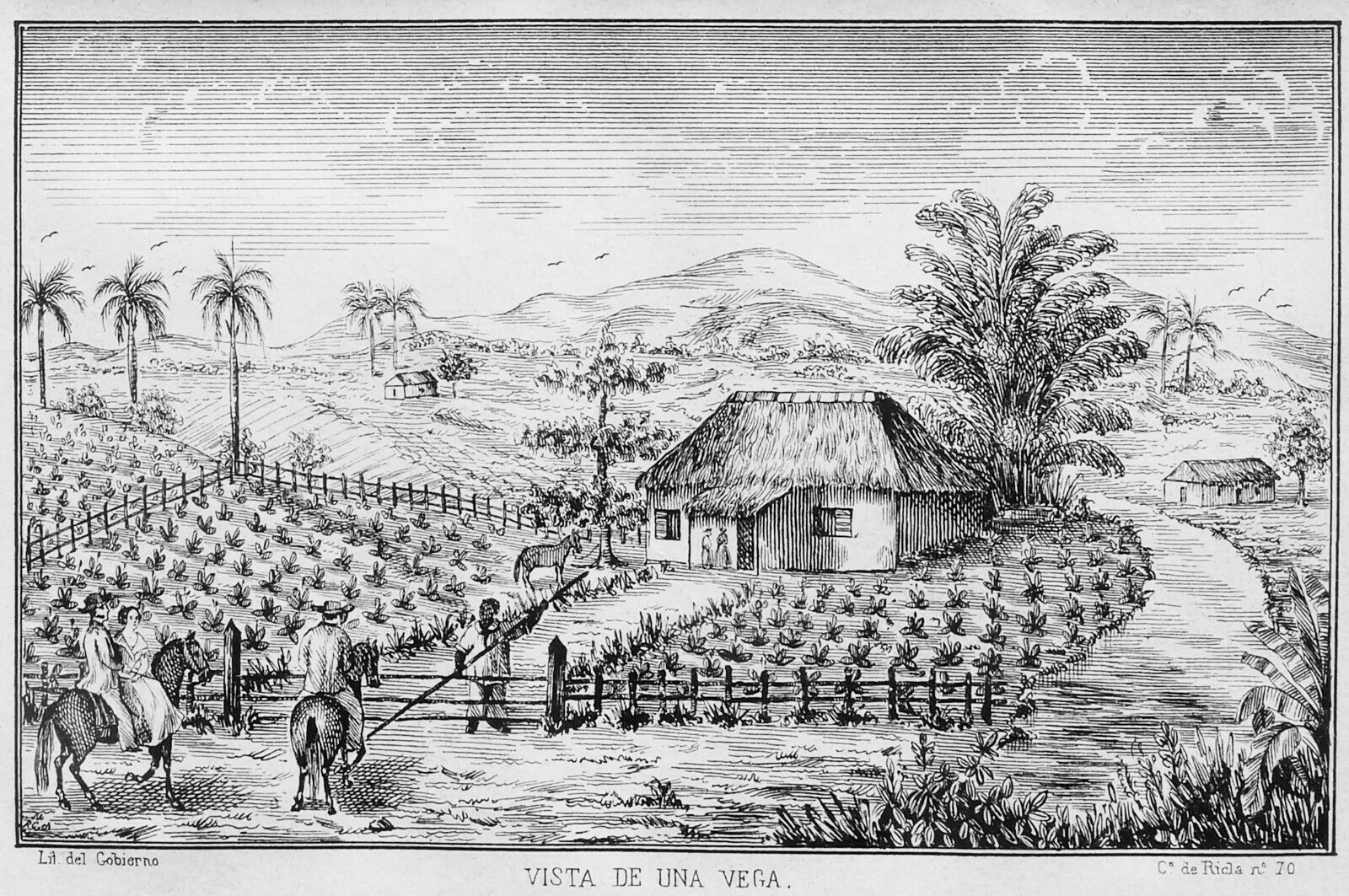
Tobacco fields in Cuba, 1859

In 1826 the first armed uprising for independence took place in Puerto Príncipe, led by Francisco Agüero Velasco and Andrés Manuel Sánchez. Both were executed, becoming the first popular martyrs of the Cuban independence movement.

The 1830s saw a surge of activity from the reformist movement, whose main leader, José Antonio Saco, stood out for his criticism of Spanish despotism and of the slave trade. Nevertheless, Cubans remained deprived of the right to send representatives to the Spanish parliament, and Madrid stepped up repression.

Under British diplomatic pressure, the Spanish government had pledged to abolish slavery. In this context, Black revolts in Cuba increased, and were put down with mass executions. One of the most significant was the Conspiración de la Escalera (Ladder Conspiracy) in 1843–1844. The Ladder Conspiracy involved free Black persons and enslaved, as well as white intellectuals and professionals. It is estimated that 300 Black and mixed-race persons died from torture, 78 were executed, over 600 were imprisoned and over 400 expelled from the island. José Antonio Saco, one of Cuba's most prominent thinkers, was expelled.

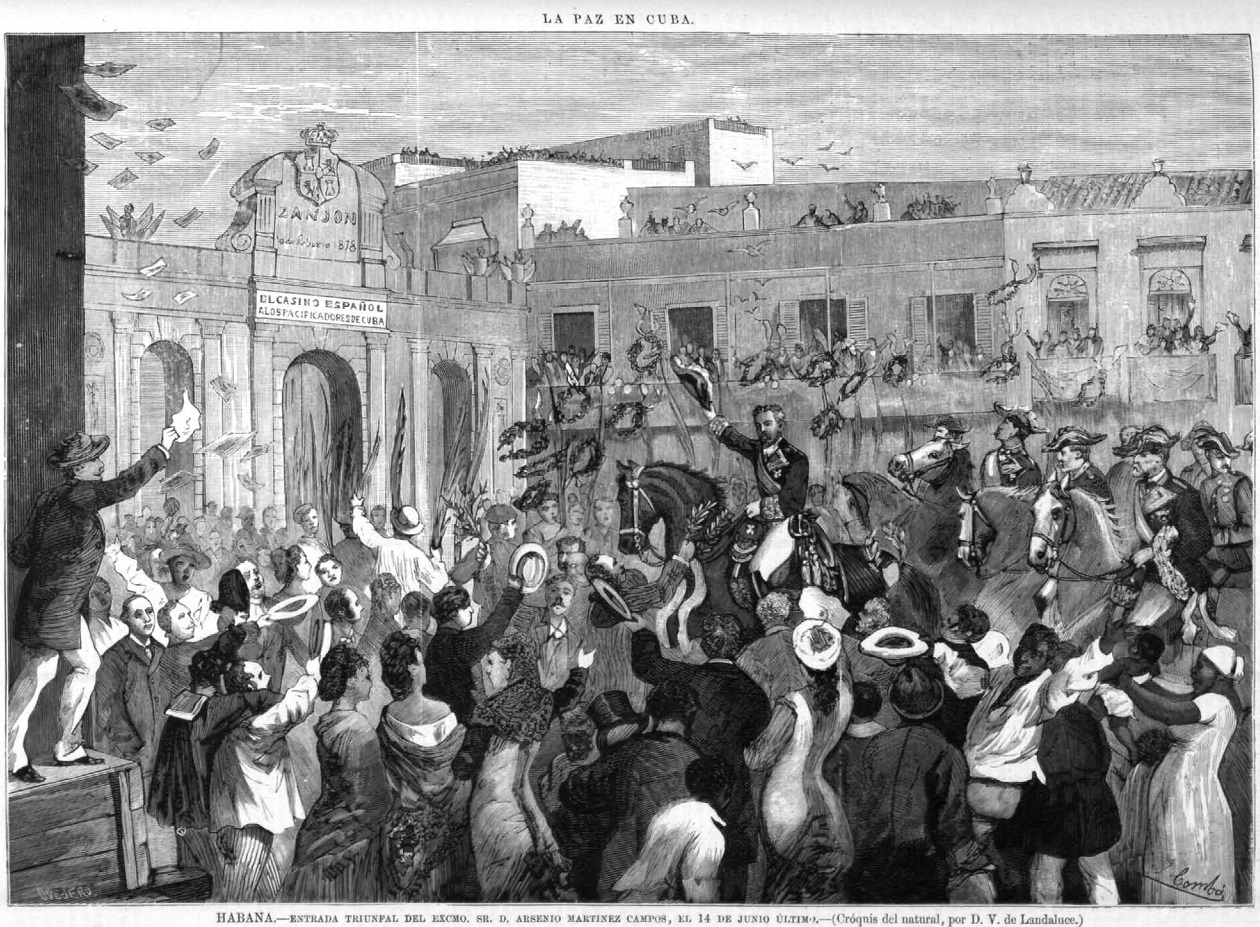
Spanish General Arsenio Martínez Campos in Havana, Colonial Cuba, 1878

Following the 1868–1878 rebellion of the Ten Years' War, all slavery was abolished by 1886. Slave traders looked for others sources of cheap labour, such as Chinese colonists and Indians from Yucatán. Another feature of the population was the number of Spanish-born colonists, known as peninsulares, who were mostly adult males; they constituted between ten and twenty per cent of the population between the middle of the 19th century and the great depression of the 1930s.

=== Possibility of annexation by the United States ===
Black unrest and attempts by the Spanish metropolis to abolish slavery motivated many Creoles to advocate Cuba's annexation by the United States, where slavery was still legal. Other Cubans supported the idea due to their desire for American-style economic development and democratic freedom. In 1805, President Thomas Jefferson considered annexing Cuba for strategic reasons, sending agents to the island to negotiate with Captain General Someruelos. In 1810, James Madison sent diplomat William Shaler to Cuba to "feel the pulse of Cuba as to an estimate of the inducements to a like incorporation of that island with the United States in comparison with those of an adherence to the Spanish Main, which cannot for a long time be equally capable of protecting the island against maritime dangers."

In April 1823, U.S. Secretary of State John Quincy Adams discussed the rules of political gravitation: "if an apple severed by its native tree cannot choose but fall to the ground, Cuba, forcibly disjoined from its own unnatural connection with Spain, and incapable of self-support, can gravitate only towards the North American Union which by the same law of nature, cannot cast her off its bosom". He furthermore warned that "the transfer of Cuba to Great Britain would be an event unpropitious to the interest of this Union". Adams voiced concern that a country outside of North America would attempt to occupy Cuba.

On 2 December 1823, U.S. President James Monroe specifically addressed Cuba and other European colonies in his proclamation of the Monroe Doctrine. Cuba, located just 94 miles (151 km) from Key West, Florida, was of interest to the doctrine's founders, as they warned European forces to leave "America for the Americans".

The most outstanding attempts in support of annexation were made by the Venezuelan filibuster General Narciso López, who prepared four expeditions to Cuba in the US. The first two, in 1848 and 1849, failed before departure due to U.S. opposition. The third, made up of some 600 men, managed to land in Cuba and take the central city of Cárdenas, but failed eventually due to a lack of popular support. López's fourth expedition landed in Pinar del Río province with around 400 men in August 1851; the invaders were defeated by Spanish troops and López was executed.

=== Struggle for independence ===
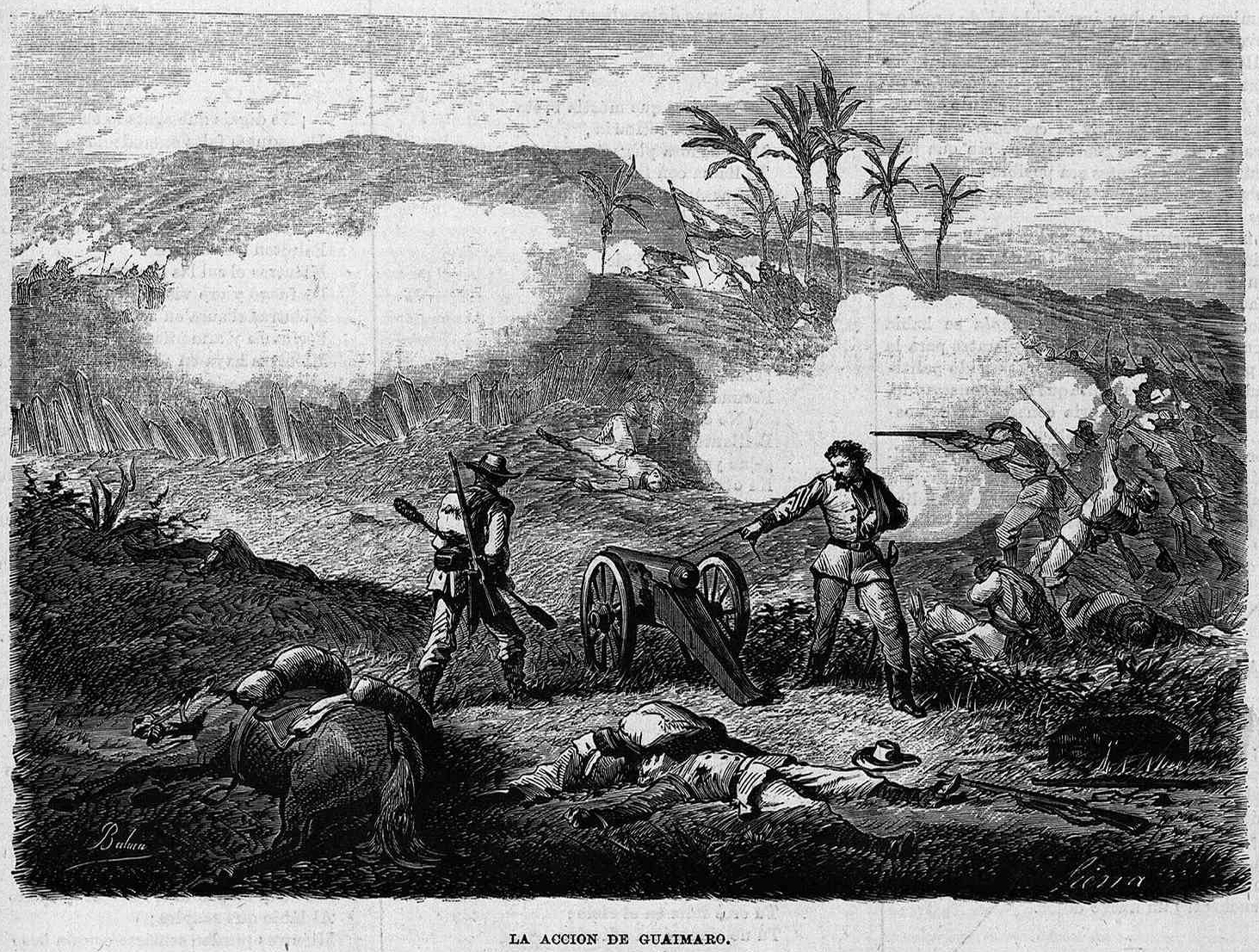
Depiction of an engagement between Cuban rebels and Spanish Royalists during the Ten Years' War (1868–78)

In the 1860s, Cuba had two more liberal-minded governors, Serrano and Dulce, who encouraged the creation of a Reformist Party, despite the fact that political parties were forbidden. But they were followed by a reactionary governor, Francisco Lersundi, who suppressed all liberties granted by the previous governors and maintained a pro-slavery regime. On 10 October 1868, the landowner Carlos Manuel de Céspedes declared Cuban independence and freedom for his slaves. This began the Ten Years' War from 1868 to 1878. The Dominican Restoration War (1863–65) brought to Cuba an unemployed mass of former Dominicans who had served with the Spanish Army in the Dominican Republic before being evacuated to Cuba. Some of these former soldiers joined the new Revolutionary Army and provided its initial training and leadership.

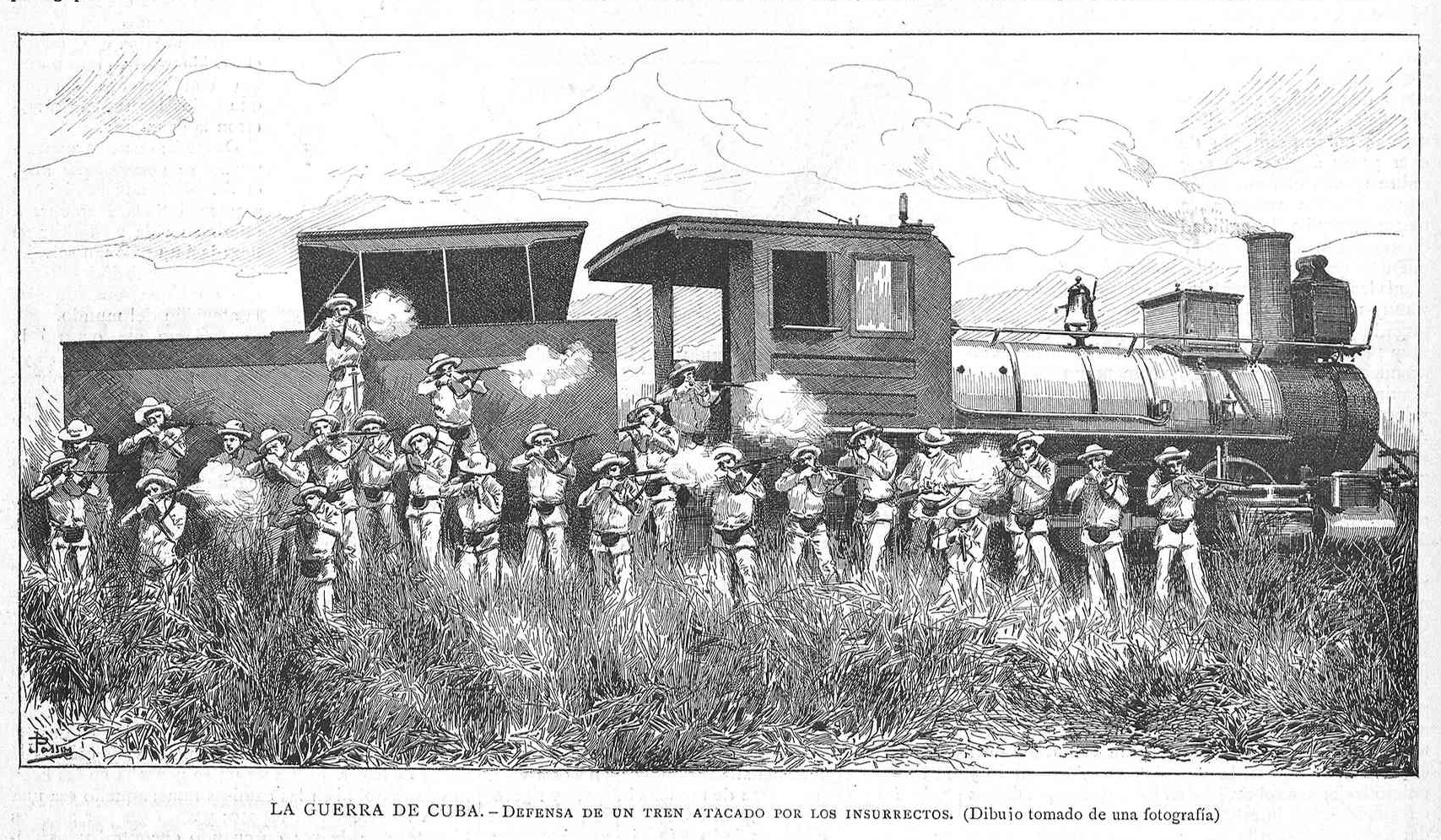
Defense of a train attacked by Cuban insurgents

With reinforcements and guidance from the Dominicans, the Cuban rebels defeated Spanish detachments, cut railway lines, and gained dominance over vast sections of the eastern portion of the island. The Spanish government used the Voluntary Corps to commit harsh acts against the Cuban rebels, and the Spanish atrocities fuelled the growth of insurgent forces; however, they failed to export the revolution to the west. On 11 May 1873, Ignacio Agramonte was killed by a stray bullet; Céspedes was killed on 27 February 1874. In 1875, Máximo Gómez began an invasion of Las Villas west of a fortified military line, or trocha, bisecting the island. The trocha was built between 1869 and 1872; the Spanish erected it to prevent Gómez to move westward from Oriente province. It was the largest fortification built by the Spanish in the Americas.

Gómez was controversial in his calls to burn sugar plantations to harass the Spanish occupiers. After the American admiral Henry Reeve was killed in 1876, Gómez ended his campaign. By that year, the Spanish government had deployed more than 250,000 troops to Cuba, as the end of the Third Carlist War had freed up Spanish soldiers. On 10 February 1878, General Arsenio Martínez Campos negotiated the Pact of Zanjón with the Cuban rebels, and the rebel general Antonio Maceo's surrender on 28 May ended the war. Spain sustained 200,000 casualties, mostly from disease; the rebels sustained 100,000–150,000 dead and the island sustained over $300 million in property damage. The Pact of Zanjón promised the manumission of all slaves who had fought for Spain during the war, and slavery was legally abolished in 1880. However, dissatisfaction with the peace treaty led to the Little War of 1879–80.

== Conflicts in the late 19th century (1886–1900) ==
=== Background ===
During the time of the so-called "Rewarding Truce", which encompassed the 17 years from the end of the Ten Years' War in 1878, fundamental changes took place in Cuban society. With the abolition of slavery in October 1886, former slaves joined the ranks of farmers and urban working class. Most wealthy Cubans lost their rural properties, and many of them joined the urban middle class. The number of sugar mills dropped and efficiency increased, with only companies and the most powerful plantation owners owning them. The numbers of campesinos and tenant farmers rose considerably. Furthermore, American capital began flowing into Cuba, mostly into the sugar and tobacco businesses and mining. By 1895, these investments totalled $50 million. Although Cuba remained Spanish politically, economically it became increasingly dependent on the United States.

These changes also entailed the rise of labour movements. The first Cuban labour organization, the Cigar Makers Guild, was created in 1878, followed by the Central Board of Artisans in 1879, and many more across the island. Abroad, a new trend of aggressive American influence emerged. Secretary of State James G. Blaine placed particular importance on the control of Cuba: "If ever ceasing to be Spanish, Cuba must necessarily become American and not fall under any other European domination".

=== Martí's Insurrection and the start of the war ===
After his second deportation to Spain in 1878, the pro-independence Cuban activist José Martí moved to the United States in 1881, where he began mobilizing the support of the Cuban exile community in Florida. He sought a revolution and Cuban independence from Spain, but also lobbied to oppose U.S. annexation of Cuba. Propaganda efforts by the Cuban Junta continued for years and intensified starting in 1895.

After deliberations with patriotic clubs across the United States, the Antilles and Latin America, the Partido Revolucionario Cubano (Cuban Revolutionary Party) was officially proclaimed on 10 April 1892, with the purpose of gaining independence for both Cuba and Puerto Rico. Martí was elected delegate, the highest party position. In Foner's words, "Martí's impatience to start the revolution for independence was affected by his growing fear that the United States would succeed in annexing Cuba before the revolution could liberate the island from Spain".

On 25 December 1894, three ships set sail for Cuba from Fernandina Beach, Florida, loaded with armed men and supplies. Two of the ships were seized by U.S. authorities in early January, but the proceedings went ahead. The insurrection began on 24 February 1895, with uprisings across the island. The uprisings in the central part of the island, such as Ibarra, Jagüey Grande and Aguada, suffered from poor co-ordination and failed; the leaders were captured, some of them deported and some executed. In the province of Havana the insurrection was discovered before it got off and the leaders detained. Thus, the insurgents further west in Pinar del Río were ordered to wait.

Martí, on his way to Cuba, gave the Proclamation of Montecristi in Santo Domingo, outlining the policy for Cuba's war of independence: the war was to be waged by blacks and whites alike; participation of all blacks was crucial for victory; Spaniards who did not object to the war effort should be spared, private rural properties should not be damaged; and the revolution should bring new economic life to Cuba.

On 1 and 11 April 1895, the main rebel leaders landed on two expeditions in Oriente: Major Antonio Maceo and 22 members near Baracoa and Martí, Máximo Gómez and four other members in Playitas. Around that time, Spanish forces in Cuba numbered about 80,000, including 60,000 Spanish and Cuban volunteers. The latter were a locally enlisted force that took care of most of the guard and police duties on the island. By December, 98,412 regular troops had been sent to the island and the number of volunteers had increased to 63,000 men. By the end of 1897, there were 240,000 regulars and 60,000 irregulars on the island. The revolutionaries were far outnumbered.

The rebels came to be nicknamed "Mambis" after a black Spanish officer, Juan Ethninius Mamby, who joined the Dominicans in the fight for independence in 1846. When the Ten Years' War broke out in 1868, some of the same soldiers were assigned to Cuba, importing what had by then become a derogatory Spanish slur. The Cubans adopted the name with pride.

After the Ten Years' War, possession of weapons by private individuals was prohibited in Cuba. Thus, one of the most serious and persistent problems for the rebels was a shortage of suitable weapons. This lack of arms forced them to utilise guerrilla tactics, using the environment, the element of surprise, fast horses and simple weapons such as machetes. Most of their firearms were acquired in raids on the Spaniards. Between 11 June 1895 and 30 November 1897, 60 attempts were made to bring weapons and supplies to the rebels from outside Cuba, but only one succeeded, largely due to British naval protection.

=== Escalation of the war ===
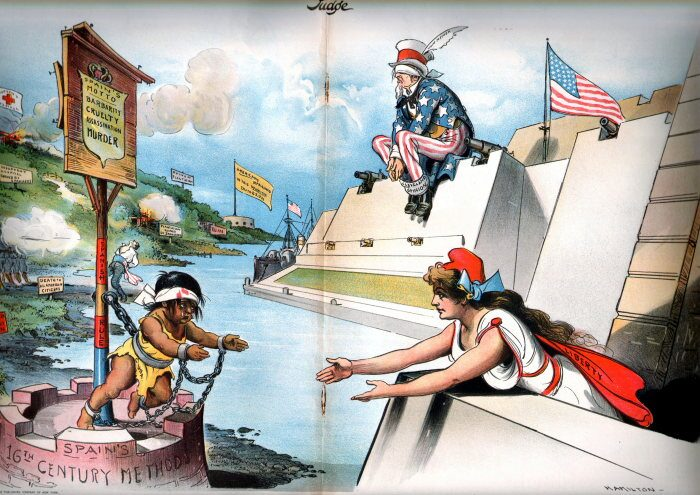
Rebel leaders engaged in extensive propaganda to get the U.S. to intervene, as shown in this cartoon in an American magazine. Columbia (the American people) reaches out to help oppressed Cuba in 1897 while Uncle Sam (the U.S. government) is blind to the crisis and will not use its powerful guns to help. Judge magazine, 6 February 1897

Martí was killed on 19 May 1895, but Máximo Gómez (a Dominican) and Antonio Maceo (a mulatto) fought on. Gómez used scorched-earth tactics, which entailed dynamiting passenger trains and burning the Spanish loyalists' property and sugar plantations—including many owned by Americans. By the end of June all of Camagüey was at war. Continuing west, Gómez and Maceo joined up with veterans of the 1868 war, Polish internationalists, General Carlos Roloff and Serafín Sánchez in Las Villas. In mid-September, representatives of the five Liberation Army Corps assembled in Jimaguayú to approve the Jimaguayú Constitution. This constitution established a central government, which grouped the executive and legislative powers into one entity, the Government Council, which was headed by Salvador Cisneros and Bartolomé Masó.

After a period of consolidation in the three eastern provinces, the liberation armies headed for Camagüey and then for Matanzas, outmanoeuvring and deceiving the Spanish Army. The revolutionaries defeated the Spanish general Arsenio Martínez Campos and killed his most trusted general at Peralejo. Campos tried the same strategy he had employed in the Ten Years' War, constructing a broad defensive belt across the island, about 80 kilometres (50 mi) long and 200 metres (660 ft) wide. This line, called the trocha, was intended to limit rebel activities to the eastern provinces, and consisted of a railroad, from Jucaro in the south to Moron in the north, on which armored railcars could travel. At various points along this railroad there were fortifications, posts and barbed wire; booby traps were placed at the locations most likely to be attacked.

For the rebels, it was essential to bring the war to the western provinces of Matanzas, Havana and Pinar del Río, where the island's government and wealth was located. In a successful cavalry campaign, overcoming the trochas, the rebels invaded every province. Surrounding all the larger cities and well-fortified towns, they arrived at the westernmost tip of the island on 22 January 1896.

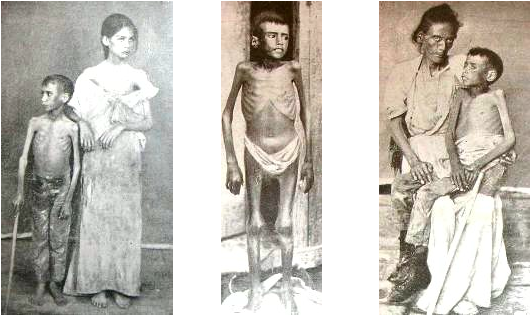
Cuban victims of Spanish reconcentration policies

Unable to defeat the rebels with conventional military tactics, the Spanish government sent Gen. Valeriano Weyler y Nicolau (nicknamed The Butcher), who reacted to these rebel successes by introducing terror methods: periodic executions, mass exiles, and the destruction of farms and crops. These methods reached their height on 21 October 1896, when he ordered all countryside residents and their livestock to gather in various fortified areas and towns occupied by his troops. Hundreds of thousands of people had to leave their homes, creating appalling conditions of overcrowding. This was the first recorded and recognized use of concentration camps where non-combatants were removed from their land to deprive the enemy of succor and then the internees were subjected to appalling conditions. It is estimated that this measure caused the death of at least one-third of Cuba's rural population. The forced relocation policy was maintained until March 1898.

Since the early 1880s, Spain had also been suppressing an independence movement in the Philippines, which was intensifying; Spain was thus now fighting two wars, which placed a heavy burden on its economy. In secret negotiations in 1896, Spain turned down the United States' offers to buy Cuba.

Maceo was killed on 7 December 1896. As the war continued, the major obstacle to Cuban success was weapons supply. Although weapons and funding came from within the United States, the supply operation violated American laws, which were enforced by the U.S. Coast Guard; of 71 resupply missions, only 27 got through.

In 1897, the liberation army maintained a privileged position in Camagüey and Oriente, where the Spanish only controlled a few cities. Spanish liberal leader Praxedes Sagasta admitted in May 1897: "After having sent 200,000 men and shed so much blood, we don't own more land on the island than what our soldiers are stepping on". The rebel force of 3,000 defeated the Spanish in various encounters, such as the battle of La Reforma and the surrender of Las Tunas on 30 August, and the Spaniards were kept on the defensive.

As stipulated at the Jimaguayú Assembly two years earlier, a second Constituent Assembly met in La Yaya, Camagüey, on 10 October 1897. The newly adopted constitution decreed that a military command be subordinated to civilian rule. The government was confirmed, naming Bartolomé Masó as president and Domingo Méndez Capote as vice president. Thereafter, Madrid decided to change its policy toward Cuba, replacing Weyler, drawing up a colonial constitution for Cuba and Puerto Rico, and installing a new government in Havana. But with half the country out of its control, and the other half in arms, the new government was powerless and rejected by the rebels.

=== USS Maine incident ===
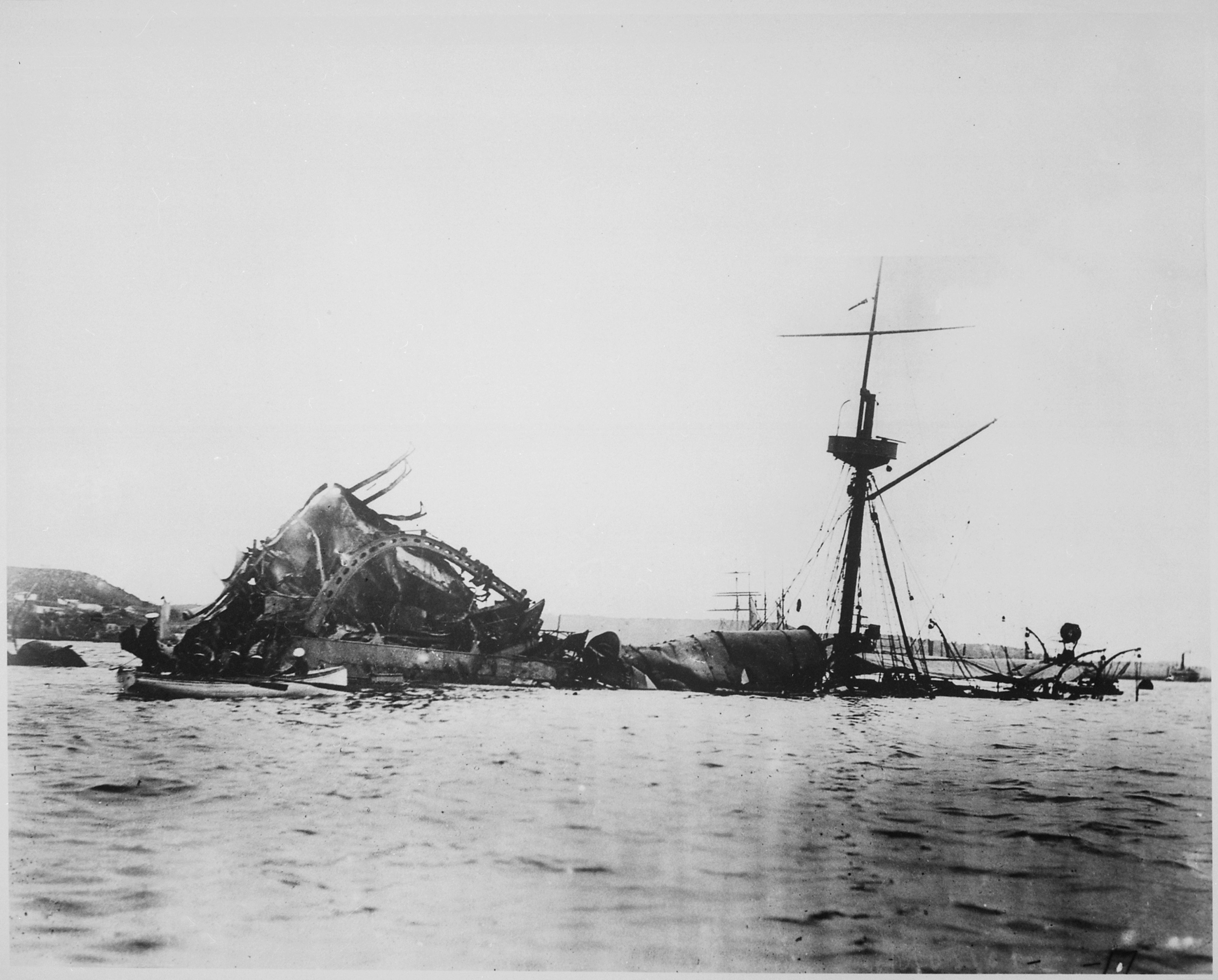
The wreckage of the USS Maine, photographed in 1898

The Cuban struggle for independence had captured the North American imagination for years and newspapers had been agitating for intervention with sensational stories of Spanish atrocities. Americans came to believe that Cuba's battle with Spain resembled the United States's Revolutionary War. North American public opinion was very much in favor of intervening for the Cubans.

In January 1898, a riot by Cuban-Spanish loyalists against the new autonomous government broke out in Havana, leading to the destruction of the printing presses of four local newspapers which published articles critical of the Spanish Army. The U.S. Consul-General cabled Washington, fearing for the lives of Americans living in Havana. In response, the battleship USS Maine was sent to Havana. On 15 February 1898, the Maine was destroyed by an explosion, killing 268 crewmembers. The cause of the explosion has not been clearly established, but the incident focused American attention on Cuba, and President William McKinley and his supporters could not stop Congress from declaring war to "liberate" Cuba. In an attempt to appease the United States, the colonial government ended the forced relocation policy and offered negotiations with the independence fighters. However, the truce was rejected by the rebels and the concessions proved too late. Madrid asked other European powers for help; they refused.

On 11 April 1898, McKinley asked Congress for authority to send U.S. Armed Forces troops to Cuba for the purpose of ending the civil war. On 19 April, Congress passed joint resolutions supporting Cuban independence and disclaiming any intention to annex Cuba, demanding Spanish withdrawal, and authorizing military force to help Cuban patriots gain independence. This included from Senator Henry Teller the Teller Amendment, which passed unanimously, stipulating that "the island of Cuba is, and by right should be, free and independent". The amendment disclaimed any intention on the part of the United States to exercise jurisdiction or control over Cuba for other than pacification reasons. War was declared on 20/21 April 1898.

=== Cuban Theatre of the Spanish–American War ===
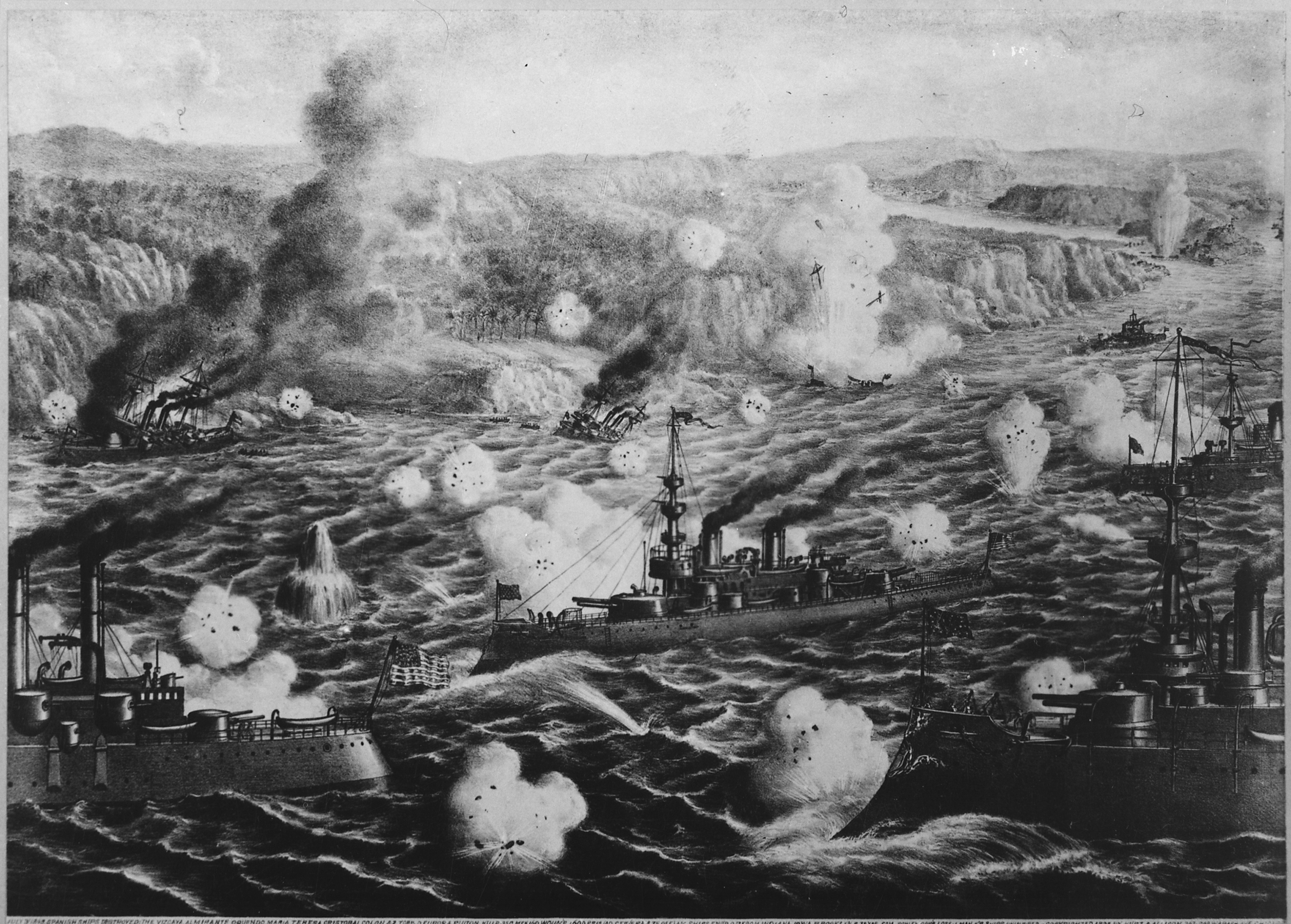
Destruction of Admiral Cervera's Spanish Fleet off Santiago de Cuba. 1898.

Hostilities started hours after the declaration of war when a U.S. contingent under Admiral William T. Sampson blockaded several Cuban ports. The Americans decided to invade Cuba in Oriente where the Cubans were able to co-operate. The first U.S. objective was to capture the city of Santiago de Cuba to destroy Linares' army and Cervera's fleet. To reach Santiago they had to pass through concentrated Spanish defences in the San Juan Hills. Between 22 and 24 June 1898 the Americans landed under General William R. Shafter at Daiquirí and Siboney and established a base. The port of Santiago became the main target of U.S. naval operations, and the American fleet attacking Santiago needed shelter from the summer hurricane season. Nearby Guantánamo Bay was chosen for this purpose and attacked on 6 June. The Battle of Santiago de Cuba, on 3 July 1898, was the largest naval engagement during the Spanish–American War, and resulted in the destruction of the Spanish Caribbean Squadron.

Resistance in Santiago consolidated around Fort Canosa, while major battles between Spaniards and Americans took place at Las Guasimas on 24 June, and at El Caney and San Juan Hill on 1 July, after which the American advance ground to a halt. Spanish troops successfully defended Fort Canosa, allowing them to stabilize their line and bar the entry to Santiago. The Americans and Cubans began a siege of the city, which surrendered on 16 July after the defeat of the Spanish Caribbean Squadron. Thus, Oriente fell under the control of Americans and the Cubans, but U.S. General Nelson A. Miles would not allow Cuban troops to enter Santiago, claiming that he wanted to prevent clashes between Cubans and Spaniards. Cuban General Calixto García, head of the mambi forces in the Eastern department, ordered his troops to hold their areas and resigned, writing a letter of protest to General Shafter.

After losing the Philippines and Puerto Rico, which had also been invaded by the United States, Spain sued for peace on 17 July 1898. On 12 August, the U.S. and Spain signed a protocol of peace, in which Spain agreed to relinquish Cuba. On 10 December 1898, the U.S. and Spain signed the formal Treaty of Paris, recognizing continuing U. S. military occupation. Although the Cubans had participated in the liberation efforts, the United States prevented Cuba from sending representatives to the Paris peace talks or signing the treaty, which set no time limit for U.S. occupation and excluded the Isle of Pines from Cuba. Although the U.S. president had no objection to Cuba's eventual independence, U.S. General William R. Shafter refused to allow Cuban General Calixto García and his rebel forces to participate in the surrender ceremonies in Santiago de Cuba.

== U.S. occupation (1898–1902) ==
After the last Spanish troops left the island in December 1898, the government of Cuba was temporarily handed over to the United States on 1 January 1899. The first governor was General John R. Brooke. Unlike Puerto Rico, Guam, and the Philippines, the United States did not annex Cuba because of the restrictions imposed in the Teller Amendment.

=== Political changes ===
The U.S. administration was undecided on Cuba's future status. Once it had been pried away from the Spaniards it was to be assured that it moved and remained in the U.S. sphere. How this was to be achieved was a matter of intense discussion and annexation was an option. Brooke set up a civilian government, placed U.S. governors in seven newly created departments, and named civilian governors for the provinces as well as mayors and representatives for the municipalities. Many Spanish colonial government officials were kept in their posts. The population were ordered to disarm and, ignoring the Mambi Army, Brooke created the Rural Guard and municipal police corps at the service of the occupation forces. Cuba's judicial powers and courts remained legally based on the codes of the Spanish government. Tomás Estrada Palma, Martí's successor as delegate of the Cuban Revolutionary Party, dissolved the party a few days after the signing of the Paris Treaty. The revolutionary Assembly of Representatives was also dissolved.

=== Economic changes ===
Before the United States officially took over the government, it had already begun cutting tariffs on American goods entering Cuba, without granting the same rights to Cuban goods going to the United States. Government payments had to be made in U.S. dollars. The Foraker Amendment prohibited the U.S. occupation government from granting privileges and concessions to American investors, to appease anti-imperialists during the occupational period. Despite this, the Cuban economy was soon dominated by American capital. By 1905, nearly 10% of Cuba's land area belonged to Americans. By 1902, American companies controlled 80% of Cuba's ore exports and owned most of the sugar and cigarette factories.

Immediately after the war, there were several serious barriers for foreign businesses attempting to operate in Cuba. The Joint Resolution of 1898, the Teller Amendment, and the Foraker Amendment threatened foreign investment. Eventually, Cornelius Van Horne of the Cuba Company, an early railroad company in Cuba, found a loophole in "revocable permits" justified by preexisting Spanish legislation that effectively allowed railroads to be built in Cuba. General Leonard Wood, the governor of Cuba and a noted annexationist, used this loophole to grant hundreds of franchises, permits, and other concessions to American businesses.

Once the legal barriers were overcome, American investments transformed the Cuban economy. Within two years of entering Cuba, the Cuba Company built a 350-mile railroad connecting the eastern port of Santiago to the existing railways in central Cuba. The company was the largest single foreign investment in Cuba for the first two decades of the twentieth century. By the 1910s it was the largest company in the country. The improved infrastructure allowed the sugar cane industry to spread to the previously underdeveloped eastern part of the country. As many small Cuban sugar cane producers were crippled with debt and damages from the war, American companies were able to quickly and cheaply take over the industry. At the same time, new productive units called centrales could grind up to 2,000 tons of cane a day making large-scale operations most profitable. The large fixed cost of these centrales made them almost exclusively accessible to American companies with large capital stocks. Furthermore, the centrales required a large, steady flow of cane to remain profitable, which led to further consolidation. Cuban cane farmers who had formerly been landowners became tenants on company land. By 1902, 40% of the country's sugar production was controlled by Americans.

With American corporate interests firmly rooted in Cuba, the U.S. tariff system was adjusted accordingly to strengthen trade between the nations. The Reciprocity Treaty of 1903 lowered the U.S. tariff on Cuban sugar by 20%. This gave Cuban sugar a competitive edge in the American marketplace. At the same time, it granted equal or greater concessions on most items imported from the United States. Cuban imports of American goods went from $17 million in the five years before the war, to $38 million in 1905, and eventually to over $200 million in 1918. Likewise, Cuban exports to the United States reached $86 million in 1905 and rose to nearly $300 million in 1918.

=== Elections and independence ===
Popular demands for a Constituent Assembly soon emerged. In December 1899, the U.S. War Secretary assured the Cuban populace that the occupation was temporary, that municipal and general elections would be held, that a Constituent Assembly would be set up, and that sovereignty would be handed to Cubans. Brooke was replaced by General Leonard Wood to oversee the transition. Parties were created, including the Cuban National Party, the Federal Republican Party of Las Villas, the Republican Party of Havana and the Democratic Union Party.

The first elections for mayors, treasurers and attorneys of the country's 110 municipalities took place on 16 June 1900, but balloting was limited to literate Cubans older than 21 and with properties worth more than $250. Only members of the dissolved Liberation Army were exempt from these conditions. Thus, the number of about 418,000 male citizens over 21 was reduced to about 151,000. The same elections were held one year later, again for a one-year-term.

Elections for 31 delegates to a Constituent Assembly were held on 15 September 1900 with the same balloting restrictions. In all three elections, pro-independence candidates won overwhelming majorities. The Constitution was drawn up from November 1900 to February 1901 and then passed by the Assembly. It established a republican form of government, proclaimed internationally recognized individual rights and liberties, freedom of religion, separation between church and state, and described the composition, structure and functions of state powers.

On 2 March 1901, the U.S. Congress passed the Army Appropriations Act, stipulating the conditions for the withdrawal of United States troops remaining in Cuba. As a rider, this act included the Platt Amendment, which defined the terms of Cuban–U.S. relations until 1934. The amendment provided for a number of rules heavily infringing on Cuba's sovereignty:

- That the government of Cuba shall never enter into any treaty with any foreign power which will impair the independence of Cuba, nor in any manner permit any foreign power to obtain control over any portion of the island.
- That Cuba would contract no foreign debt without guarantees that the interest could be served from ordinary revenues.
- That Cuba consent that the United States may intervene for the preservation of Cuban independence, to protect life, property, and individual liberty, and to discharging the obligations imposed by the treaty of Paris.
- That the Cuban claim to the Isle of Pines (now called Isla de la Juventud) was not acknowledged and to be determined by treaty.
- That Cuba commit to providing the United States "lands necessary for coaling or naval stations at certain specified points to be agreed upon".

On 6 April 1901, the Constituent Assembly rejected the Platt Amendment by a vote of 24 to 2. The United States demanded that this amendment be approved fully and without changes by the Constituent Assembly as an appendix to the new constitution. US Secretary of War Elihu Root told Governor Wood to convey to the Cuban delegates that “they never can have any further government in Cuba, except the intervening Government of the United States, until they have [approved the Platt Amendment].” On 12 June 1901, after heated debate, the Constituent Assembly approved the appendix by a margin of four votes. Wood later admitted privately to US President Roosevelt: "Little or no independence had been left to Cuba with the Platt Amendment and the only thing appropriate was to seek annexation".

In the presidential elections of 31 December 1901, Tomás Estrada Palma, an American still living in the United States, was the only candidate. His adversary, General Bartolomé Masó, withdrew his candidacy in protest against U.S. favoritism and the manipulation of the political machine by Palma's followers. Palma was elected to be the Republic's first President.

== Early 20th century (1902–1959) ==
The U.S. occupation officially ended when Palma took office on 20 May 1902. Havana and Varadero soon became popular tourist resorts. Though some efforts were made to ease Cuba's ethnic tensions through government policies, racism and informal discrimination towards blacks and mestizos remained widespread.

Guantanamo Bay was leased to the United States as part of the Platt Amendment. The status of the Isle of Pines as Cuban territory was left undefined until 1925, when the United States finally recognized Cuban sovereignty over the island. Palma governed successfully for his four-year term; yet when he tried to extend his time in office, a revolt ensued.

The Second Occupation of Cuba, also known as the Cuban Pacification, was a major US military operation that began in September 1906. After the collapse of Palma's regime, US President Roosevelt invaded and established an occupation that would continue for nearly two and a half years. The stated goal of the operation was to prevent fighting between the Cubans, to protect North American economic interests, and to hold free elections. In 1906, the United States representative William Howard Taft negotiated an end of the successful revolt led by the young general Enrique Loynaz del Castillo. Palma resigned and the United States Governor Charles Magoon assumed temporary control until 1909. Following the election of José Miguel Gómez in November 1908, Cuba was deemed stable enough to allow a withdrawal of American troops, which was completed in February 1909.

For three decades, the country was led by former War of Independence leaders, who after being elected did not serve more than two constitutional terms. The Cuban presidential succession was as follows: José Miguel Gómez (1908–1912); Mario García Menocal (1913–1920); Alfredo Zayas (1921–25) and Gerardo Machado (1925–1933).

Under the Liberal Gómez the participation of Afro-Cubans in the political process was curtailed when the Partido Independiente de Color was outlawed and bloodily suppressed in 1912, as American troops reentered the country to protect the sugar plantations. Under Gómez's successor, Mario Menocal of the Conservative Party, income from sugar rose steeply. Menocal's reelection in 1916 was met with armed revolt by Gómez and other Liberals (the so-called "Chambelona War"), prompting the United States to send in Marines. Gómez was defeated and captured and the rebellion was snuffed out.

In World War I, Cuba declared war on Imperial Germany on 7 April 1917, one day after the United States entered the war. Despite being unable to send troops to fight in Europe, Cuba played a significant role as a base to protect the West Indies from German U-boat attacks. A draft law was instituted, and 25,000 Cuban troops raised, but the war ended before they could be sent into action.

Alfredo Zayas was elected president in 1920 and took office in 1921. When the Cuban financial system collapsed after a drop in sugar prices, Zayas secured a loan from the United States in 1922. One historian has concluded that the continued U.S. military intervention and economic dominance had once again made Cuba "a colony in all but name."

=== Post-World War I ===
President Gerardo Machado was elected by popular vote in 1925, but he was constitutionally barred from reelection. Machado, determined to modernize Cuba, set in motion several massive civil works projects such as the Central Highway, but at the end of his constitutional term he held on to power. The United States decided not to interfere militarily. In the late 1920s and early 1930s a number of Cuban action groups staged a series of uprisings that either failed or did not affect the capital.

The Sergeants' Revolt undermined the institutions and coercive structures of the oligarchic state. The young and relatively inexperienced revolutionaries found themselves pushed into the halls of state power by worker and peasant mobilisations. Between September 1933 and January 1934 a loose coalition of radical activists, students, middle-class intellectuals, and disgruntled lower-rank soldiers formed a Provisional Revolutionary Government. This coalition was directed by a popular university professor, Dr Ramón Grau San Martín. The Grau government promised a 'new Cuba' which would belong to all classes, and the abrogation of the Platt Amendment. They believed their legitimacy stemmed from the popular support which brought them to power, and not from the approval of the United States Department of State.

To this end, throughout the autumn of 1933, the government decreed a dramatic series of reforms. The Platt Amendment was unilaterally abrogated, and all the political parties of the Machadato were dissolved. The Provisional Government granted autonomy to the University of Havana, women obtained the right to vote, the eight-hour day was decreed, a minimum wage was established for cane-cutters, and compulsory arbitration was promoted. The government created a Ministry of Labour, and a law was passed establishing that 50 per cent of all workers in agriculture, commerce and industry had to be Cuban citizens. The Grau regime set agrarian reform as a priority, promising peasants legal title to their lands. The Provisional Government survived until January 1934, when it was overthrown by an anti-government coalition of right-wing civilian and military elements. Led by a young mestizo sergeant, Fulgencio Batista, this movement was supported by the United States.

=== 1940 Constitution and the Batista era ===
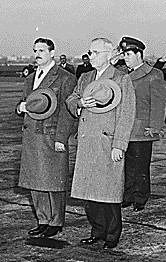
President Carlos Prío Socarrás (left), with US president Harry S. Truman in Washington, D.C. in 1948

==== Rise of Batista ====
In 1940, Cuba conducted free and fair national elections. Fulgencio Batista, was originally endorsed by Communist leaders in exchange for the legalization of the Popular Socialist Party and Communist domination of the labor movement. The reorganization of the labor movement during this time was capped with the establishment of the Confederacion de Trajabadores de Cuba (Confederation of Cuban Workers, or CTC), in 1938. However, in 1947, the Communists lost control of the CTC, and their influence in the trade union movement gradually declined into the 1950s. The assumption of the Presidency by Batista in 1952 and the intervening years to 1958 placed tremendous strain on the labor movement, with some independent union leaders resigning from the CTC in opposition to Batista's rule. The relatively progressivist 1940 Constitution was adopted by the Batista administration. The constitution denied Batista the possibility of running consecutively in the 1944 election.

Rather than endorsing Batista's hand-picked successor Carlos Zayas, the Cuban people elected Ramón Grau San Martín in 1944. Grau made a deal with labor unions to continue Batista's pro-labor policies. Grau's administration coincided with the end of World War II, and he presided over an economic boom as sugar production expanded and prices rose. He instituted programs of public works and school construction, increasing social security benefits and encouraging economic development and agricultural production. However, increased prosperity brought increased corruption and urban violence. The country was also steadily gaining a reputation as a base for organized crime, with the Havana Conference of 1946 seeing leading Mafia mobsters descend upon the city.

Grau's presidency was followed by that of Carlos Prío Socarrás, whose government was tainted by increasing corruption and violent incidents among political factions. Eduardo Chibás – the leader of the Partido Ortodoxo (Orthodox Party), a nationalist group – was widely expected to win in 1952 on an anticorruption platform. However, Chibás committed suicide before he could run, and the opposition was left without a unifying leader. Batista seized power in an almost bloodless coup. President Prío was forced to leave Cuba. Due to the corruption of the previous two administrations, the general public reaction to the coup was somewhat accepting at first. However, Batista soon encountered stiff opposition when he temporarily suspended balloting and the 1940 constitution, and attempted to rule by decree. Nonetheless, elections were held in 1954 and Batista was re-elected under disputed circumstances.

==== Economic expansion and stagnation ====
Although corruption was rife under Batista, Cuba did flourish economically. Wages rose significantly; according to the International Labour Organization, the average industrial salary in Cuba was the world's eighth-highest in 1958, and the average agricultural wage was higher than in developed nations such as Denmark and France. Although a third of the population still lived in poverty (according to Batista's government), Cuba was one of the five most developed countries in Latin America by the end of the Batista era, with 56% of the population living in cities.

In the 1950s, Cuba's gross domestic product (GDP) per capita was roughly equal to that of contemporary Italy, although still only a sixth as large as that of the United States. Labour rights were also favourable – Cuban workers were entitled to a month's paid holiday, nine days' sick leave with pay, and six weeks' leave before and after childbirth. Cuba had Latin America's highest per capita consumption rates of meat, vegetables, cereals, automobiles, telephones and radios during this period. Havana was the world's fourth-most-expensive city at the time. Moreover, Cuba's health service was remarkably developed. By the late 1950s, Cuba also ranked 11th in the world in the number of doctors per capita. Although there was massive inequality in the distribution of doctors, for example more than 60% of all doctors lived and worked in Havana in 1958 and even when they worked outside Havana province they typically worked in other provincial capitals. According to the World Health Organization, the island had the lowest infant mortality rate in Latin America, and the 13th-lowest in the world. Cuba's education spending in the 1950s was the highest in Latin America, relative to GDP. Cuba had the fourth-highest literacy rate in the region, although two-thirds of the people received three years of education or less; one-third never attended school and half the adult population could neither read nor write.

However, the United States, rather than Latin America, was the frame of reference for educated Cubans. Middle-class Cubans grew frustrated at the economic gap between Cuba and the US, and increasingly dissatisfied with the administration. Large income disparities arose due to the extensive privileges enjoyed by Cuba's unionized workers. Cuban labour unions had established limitations on mechanization and even banned dismissals in some factories. The labour unions' privileges were obtained in large measure "at the cost of the unemployed and the peasants".

Cuba's labour regulations ultimately caused economic stagnation. Hugh Thomas asserts that "militant unions succeeded in maintaining the position of unionized workers and, consequently, made it difficult for capital to improve efficiency." Between 1933 and 1958, Cuba increased economic regulation enormously. The regulation led to declining investment. The World Bank also complained that the Batista administration raised the tax burden without assessing its impact. Unemployment was high; many university graduates could not find jobs. After its earlier meteoric rise, the Cuban gross domestic product grew at only 1% annually on average between 1950 and 1958.

The United States dominated the Cuban economy before the Revolution, controlling 80 percent of Cuba’s trade. US firms ran the public utilities, the railroad, and all of the oil refineries. Two-thirds of food production came from US-owned agro-business enterprises. US developers owned half of the arable land on the island. Just 8 percent of landholders owned three-quarters of the land. At least a quarter of the population was unemployed. One-fifth of the population received 58 percent of the income, while the bottom fifth took in just 2 percent. According to PBS, a thriving middle class held the promise of prosperity and social mobility. According to Cuba historian Louis Perez of the University of North Carolina at Chapel Hill, "Havana was then what Las Vegas has become."

==== Political repression and human rights abuses ====
In 1952, while receiving military, financial, and logistical support from the United States, Batista suspended the 1940 Constitution and revoked most political liberties, including the right to strike. He then aligned with the wealthiest landowners and presided over a stagnating economy that widened the gap between rich and poor Cubans. Eventually it reached the point where most of the sugar industry was in U.S. hands, and foreigners owned 70% of the arable land. Batista's repressive government then began to systematically profit from the exploitation of Cuba's commercial interests, by negotiating lucrative relationships with both the American Mafia, who controlled the drug, gambling, and prostitution businesses in Havana, and with large U.S.-based multinational companies who were awarded lucrative contracts. To quell the growing discontent amongst the populace—displayed through frequent student riots and demonstrations—Batista established tighter censorship of the media, while also utilizing his Bureau for the Repression of Communist Activities secret police to carry out wide-scale violence, torture and public executions. Estimates range from hundreds to about 20,000 people killed.

=== Cuban Revolution (1952–1959) ===
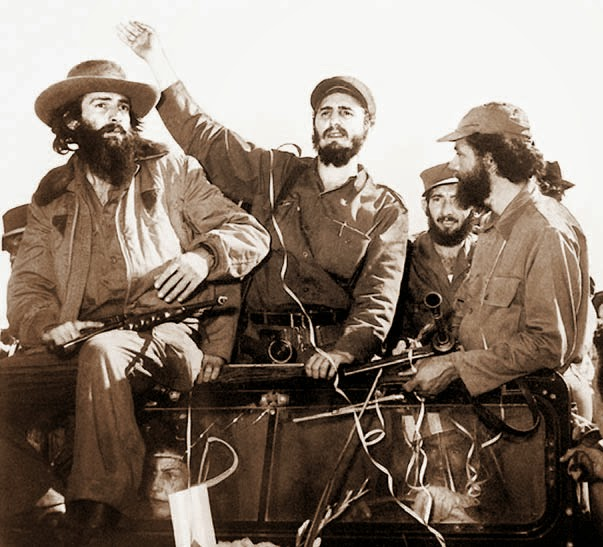
Camilo Cienfuegos, Fidel Castro, Huber Matos, entering Havana on 8 January 1959

In 1952, Fidel Castro, a young lawyer running for a seat in the Chamber of Representatives for the Partido Ortodoxo, circulated a petition to depose Batista's government on the grounds that it had illegitimately suspended the electoral process. The courts ignored the petition. Castro thus resolved to use armed force to overthrow Batista; he and his brother Raúl gathered supporters, and on 26 July 1953 led an attack on the Moncada Barracks near Santiago de Cuba. The attack ended in failure – the authorities killed several of the insurgents, captured Castro himself and sentenced him to 15 years in prison. However, the Batista government released him in 1955, when amnesty was given to many political prisoners. Castro and his brother subsequently went into exile in Mexico, where they met the Argentine revolutionary Ernesto "Che" Guevara. While in Mexico, Guevara and the Castros organized the 26 July Movement with the goal of overthrowing Batista. In December 1956, Fidel Castro led a group of 82 fighters to Cuba aboard the yacht Granma. Despite a pre-landing rising in Santiago by Frank País Pesqueira and his followers among the urban pro-Castro movement, Batista's forces promptly killed, dispersed or captured most of Castro's men.

Castro escaped into the Sierra Maestra mountains with as few as 12 fighters, aided by the urban and rural opposition. Castro and Guevara then began a guerrilla campaign against the Batista régime, with their main forces supported by numerous poorly armed escopeteros and the well-armed fighters of Frank País' urban organization. Growing anti-Batista resistance, including a bloodily crushed rising by Cuban Navy personnel in Cienfuegos, soon led to chaos. At the same time, rival guerrilla groups in the Escambray Mountains also grew more effective. Castro attempted to arrange a general strike in 1958, but could not win support among Communists or labor unions. Multiple attempts by Batista's forces to crush the rebels ended in failure. Castro's forces acquired captured weaponry, the biggest being a government M4 Sherman tank, which would be used in the Battle of Santa Clara.

The United States imposed trade restrictions on the Batista administration and sent an envoy who attempted to persuade Batista to leave the country voluntarily. With the military situation becoming untenable, Batista fled on 1 January 1959, and Castro took over. Within months Castro moved to consolidate his power by marginalizing other resistance groups and imprisoning and executing opponents and dissidents. As the revolution became more radical and continued its marginalization of the wealthy and political opponents, thousands of Cubans fled the island, eventually forming a large exile community in the United States.

== Government of Fidel Castro (1959–2012) ==
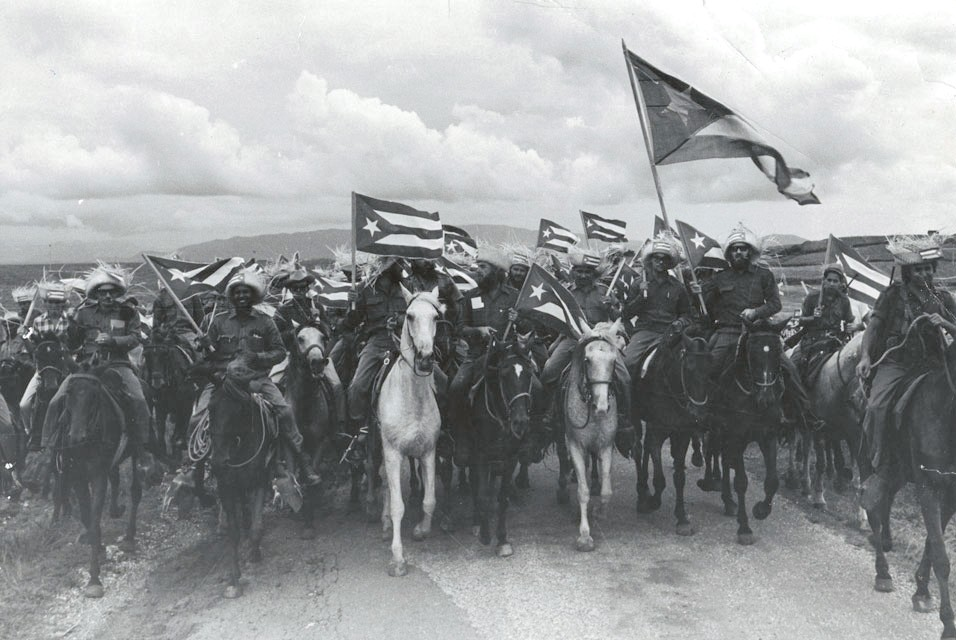
Fidel Castro's July 26 Movement rebels mounted on horses in 1959

=== 1959: "Year of Liberation" ===
On 1 January 1959, Che Guevara marched his troops from Santa Clara to Havana, without encountering resistance. Meanwhile, Fidel Castro marched his soldiers to the Moncada Army Barracks, where all 5,000 soldiers in the barracks defected to the Revolutionary movement. The United States recognized the Castro government on 7 January 1959. President Dwight D. Eisenhower sent a new ambassador, Philip Bonsal, to replace Earl E. T. Smith, who had been close to Batista. The Eisenhower administration, in agreement with the American media and Congress, did this with the assumption that "Cuba [would] remain in the U.S. sphere of influence". However, Castro belonged to a faction which opposed U.S. influence. Earlier, during the guerilla war, on 5 June 1958, Castro had written: "The Americans are going to pay dearly for what they are doing. When the war is over, I'll start a much longer and bigger war of my own: the war I'm going to fight against them." "Castro dreamed of a sweeping revolution that would uproot his country's oppressive socioeconomic structure and of a Cuba that would be free of the United States".

After the success of the revolution, on 4 February 1959, Fidel Castro announced a massive reform plan which included a public works project, a land reform granting nearly 200,000 families farmland, and nationalization of various industries. On April 9, 1959, Fidel Castro declared that promised elections would be postponed; under the rationale of "revolution first, elections later", inferring Castro needed time for domestic reforms before elections could take place. Later, Castro issued the first agrarian reform law, on 17 May 1959, in which the state sought to limit the size of land holdings, and to distribute that land to small farmers in "Vital Minimum" tracts. This law served as a pretext for seizing lands held by foreigners and redistributing them to Cuban citizens.

Only six months after Castro seized power, the Eisenhower administration began to plot his overthrow. The United Kingdom was persuaded to cancel a sale of Hawker Hunter fighter aircraft to Cuba. The US National Security Council (NSC) met in March 1959 to consider means to institute a régime-change and the Central Intelligence Agency (CIA) began arming guerillas inside Cuba in May. In January 1960 Roy R. Rubottom, Jr., Assistant Secretary of State for Inter-American Affairs, summarized the evolution of Cuba–United States relations since January 1959:

"The period from January to March might be characterized as the honeymoon period of the Castro government. In April a downward trend in US–Cuban relations had been evident… In June we had reached the decision that it was not possible to achieve our objectives with Castro in power and had agreed to undertake the program referred to by Undersecretary of State Livingston T. Merchant. On 31 October in agreement with the Central Intelligence Agency, the Department had recommended to the President approval of a program along the lines referred to by Mr. Merchant. The approved program authorized us to support elements in Cuba opposed to the Castro government while making Castro's downfall seem to be the result of his own mistakes."

On October 11, 1959, army officer Huber Matos resigned in protest of communist influence in the Cuban government. After Matos' arrest, a greater trend of political removals followed. Fidel Castro eventually purged all political opponents from the administration. Loyalty to Castro and the revolution became the primary criterion for all appointments. Mass organisation such as labor unions that opposed the revolutionary government were made illegal. The government of Cuba soon encountered opposition from internal opposition groups and from the United States.

=== 1960: Domestic repression and diplomatic shifts ===
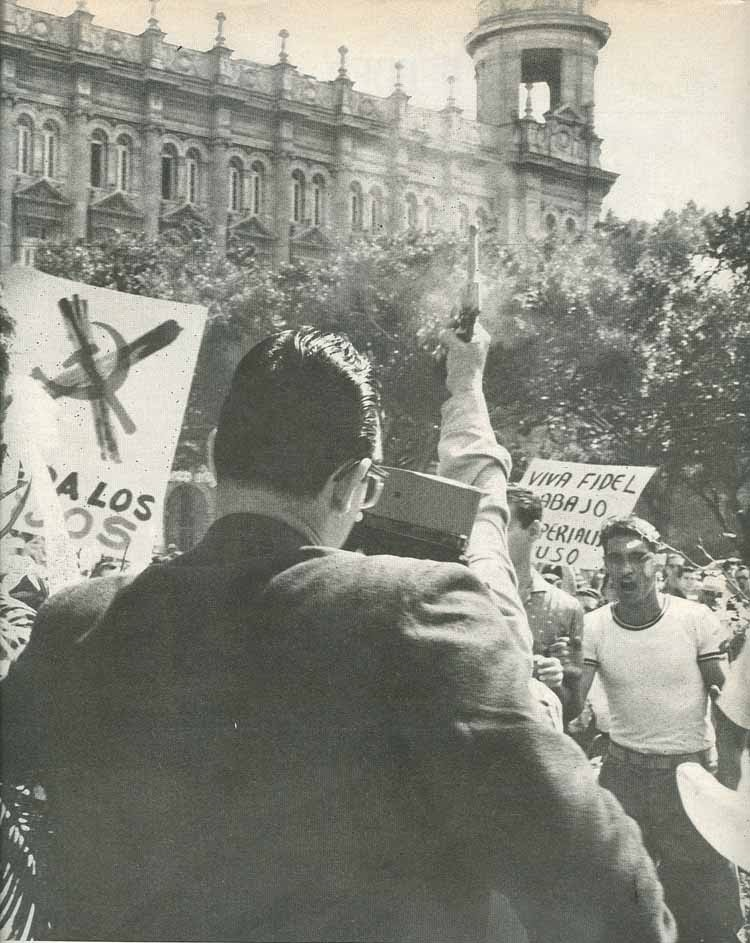
Protests against the visit of Soviet diplomat Anastas Mikoyan, dispersed by a policeman firing his gun. (February 5, 1960)

A popular desire for some form of urban-based civil defence culminated after the explosion of the French freighter La Coubre. Speaking the day after the explosion, at the funeral for 27 dock workers killed, Fidel Castro said that the United States was responsible for the explosion, calling it "the work of those who do not wish us to receive arms for our defense". U.S. Secretary of State Christian Herter denied that on 7 March in a meeting with the Cuban chargé d'affaires in Washington, then delivered a formal note of protest to Cuban Foreign Minister Raul Roa on 15 March.

A month later, at a May Day celebration in 1960, Fidel Castro finally cancelled all promised elections. In his announcement speech, Castro alluded that his government was "democratic", but still that Cuba did not need elections, which were accused of usually being "fraudulent".

Alongside worries of internal security, relations between the United States and Cuba deteriorated rapidly as the Cuban government, in reaction to the refusal of Royal Dutch Shell, Standard Oil and Texaco to refine petroleum from the Soviet Union in Cuban refineries under their control, took control of those refineries in July 1960. The Eisenhower administration promoted a boycott of Cuba by oil companies; Cuba responded by nationalizing the refineries in August 1960. Cuba expropriated more US-owned properties, notably those belonging to the International Telephone and Telegraph Company (ITT) and to the United Fruit Company.

Later, on September 28, 1960, after a bombing by the Presidential Palace, Castro announced the formation of vigilance organizations to report suspicious activity. This vigilance organization became the Committees for the Defense of the Revolution. By the end of 1960, all opposition newspapers had been closed down and all radio and television stations had come under state control. Teachers and professors found to have involvement with counter-revolution were purged. Fidel's brother Raúl Castro became the commander of the Revolutionary Armed Forces.

The United States severed diplomatic relations with Cuba on 3 January 1961, and further restricted trade in February 1962. The Organization of American States, under pressure from the United States, suspended Cuba's membership on 22 January 1962, and the U.S. government banned all U.S.–Cuban trade on 7 February. The Kennedy administration extended this ban on 8 February 1963, forbidding U.S. citizens to travel to Cuba or to conduct financial or commercial transactions with the country.

Cuba began to pursue more close relations with the Soviet Union. As early as September 1959, Valdim Kotchergin, a KGB agent, was seen in Cuba. Jorge Luis Vasquez, a Cuban who was imprisoned in East Germany, states that the East German Stasi trained the personnel of the Cuban Interior Ministry (MINIT). The relationship between the KGB and the Cuban Intelligence Directorate (DI) was complex and marked by both times of close cooperation and times of extreme competition. The Soviet Union saw the new revolutionary government in Cuba as an excellent proxy agent in areas of the world where Soviet involvement was not popular on a local level. Nikolai Leonov, the KGB chief in Mexico City, was one of the first Soviet officials to recognize Fidel Castro's potential as a revolutionary, and urged the Soviet Union to strengthen ties with the new Cuban leader. The USSR saw Cuba as having far more appeal with new revolutionary movements, western intellectuals, and members of the New Left, given Cuba's perceived David and Goliath struggle against U.S. "imperialism". In 1963, shortly after the Cuban Missile Crisis, 1,500 DI agents, including Che Guevara, were invited to the USSR for intensive training in intelligence operations.

=== Golden exile and Bay of Pigs ===
In the 1961 New Year's Day parade, the Cuban administration exhibited Soviet tanks and other weapons. Cuban officers began to receive extended military training in the Soviet Union, becoming proficient in the use of advanced Soviet weapons systems.

Castro's policies in Cuba slowly led hundreds of thousands of upper- and middle-class Cubans to flee to the United States and other countries. By 1961, thousands of Cubans had fled for the United States. On 22 March of that year, an exile council was formed. The council planned to defeat the Cuban regime and form a provisional government with José Miró Cardona, a noted leader in the civil opposition against Batista, to serve as temporary president.

In April 1961, less than four months into the Kennedy administration, the Central Intelligence Agency (CIA) executed a plan that had been developed under the Eisenhower administration. This military campaign to topple Cuba's revolutionary government is now known as the Bay of Pigs Invasion (or La Batalla de Girón in Cuba). The aim of the invasion was to empower existing opposition militant groups to "overthrow the Communist regime" and establish "a new government with which the United States can live in peace." The invasion was carried out by a CIA-sponsored paramilitary group of over 1,400 Cuban exiles called Brigade 2506. Arriving in Cuba by boat from Guatemala on 15 April, the brigade initially overwhelmed Cuba's counter-offensive. But by 20 April, the brigade surrendered and was publicly interrogated before being sent back to the US. The invasion helped further build popular support for the new Cuban government. The Kennedy administration thereafter began Operation Mongoose, a covert CIA campaign of sabotage against Cuba, including the arming of militant groups, sabotage of Cuban infrastructure, and plots to assassinate Castro. All this reinforced Castro's distrust of the US.

=== Escalante affair ===
In July 1961, the Integrated Revolutionary Organizations (IRO) was formed, merging Fidel Castro's 26th of July Movement with Blas Roca's Popular Socialist Party and Faure Chomón's Revolutionary Directory 13 March. Later, on 26 March 1962, the IRO became the United Party of the Cuban Socialist Revolution (PURSC), which, in turn, became the Communist Party on 3 October 1965, with Castro as First Secretary. The constitution secured the Communist Party's central role in governing Cuba, but kept party affiliation out of the election process.

The creation of the ORI was entrusted to PSP executive secretary Anibal Escalante, who used this opportunity to place PSP executives in positions of power and then purge the army of old guerrilla leaders, and speed up agrarian reforms which caused an economic decline. These actions were unpopular in the country causing Fidel Castro to condemn the ORI and order for its restructuring. At the end of the affair, Castro dismissed Escalante and his compatriots from the IRO.

The affair alarmed the Soviet leadership who feared a loss of good relations with Cuba. Soviet leadership was also growing to fear a possible U.S. invasion of Cuba. In this crisis of international relations the Soviet Union sent more SA-2 anti-aircraft missiles in April as well as a regiment of regular Soviet troops.

=== Cuban Missile Crisis ===
Tensions between the two governments peaked again during the October 1962 Cuban Missile Crisis. The United States had a much larger arsenal of long-range nuclear weapons than the Soviet Union, as well as medium-range ballistic missiles (MRBMs), whereas the Soviet Union had a large stockpile of medium-range nuclear weapons. Cuba agreed to let the Soviets secretly place SS-4 Sandal and SS-5 Skean MRBMs on their territory. After Lockheed U-2 reconnaissance photos confirmed the missiles' presence in Cuba, the United States established a cordon in international waters to stop Soviet ships from bringing in more (designated a quarantine rather than a blockade to avoid issues with international law). At the same time, Castro was getting a little too extreme for Moscow, so at the last moment the Soviets called back their ships. In addition, they agreed to remove the missiles already there in exchange for an agreement that the United States would not invade Cuba.

=== Early economic planning ===
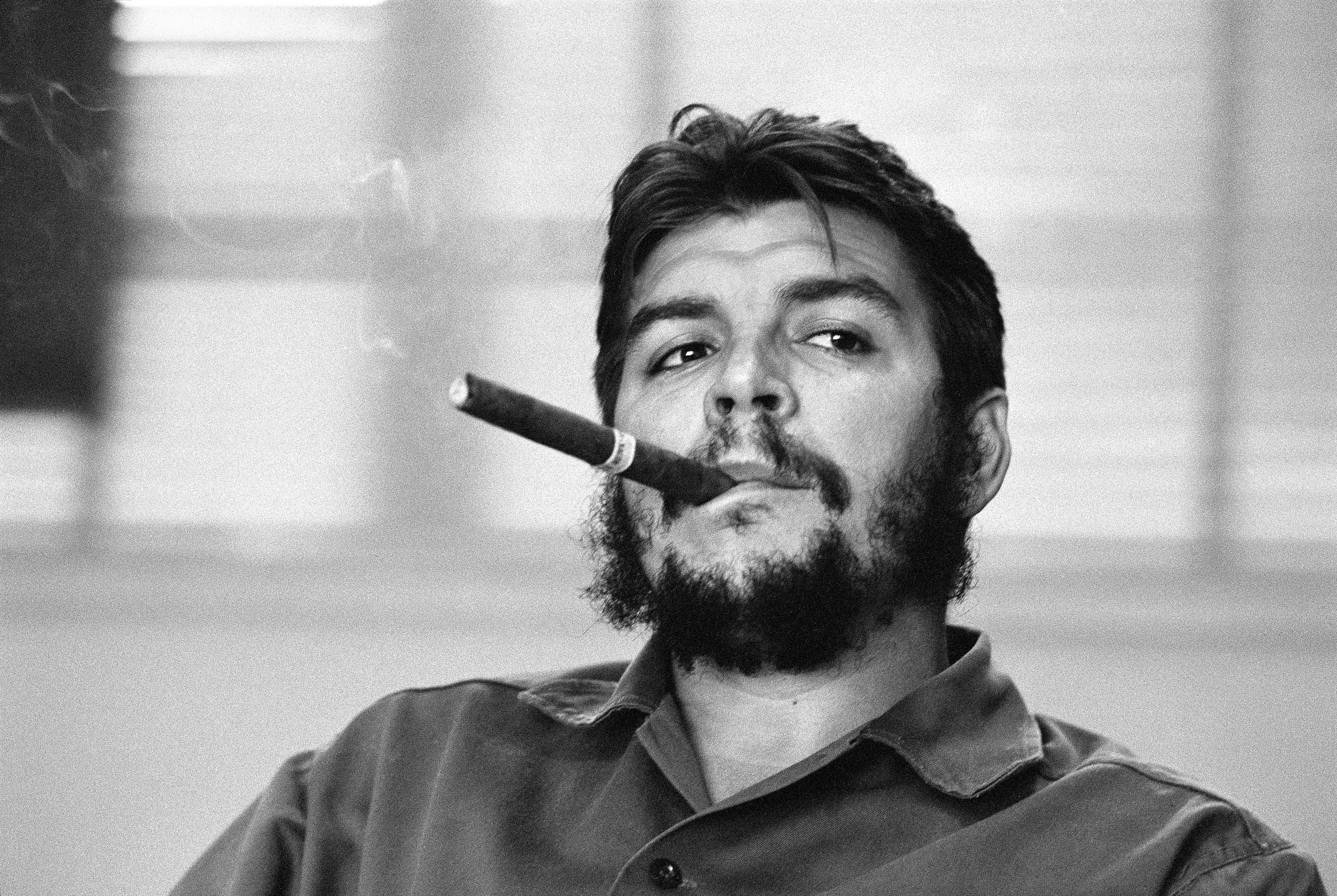
Che Guevara, posing in his office as Minister of Industries (1963)

Starting in 1961, Che Guevara spearheaded a Four Year Plan to rapidly industrialize the Cuban economy, by minimizing the sugar industry in favor of other agricultural sectors. The plan was designed to be carried out from 1962 to 1965, but was cancelled early in 1964 due to economic setbacks. Agricultural diversification led to a steep drop in sugar production, which was a vital market in Cuba.

Following the economic decline brought by the Four Year Plan, Fidel Castro invited leftist economists from all over the world to print their opinions in economic journals in Cuba about how Cuba should develop into a communist society. The two main spokespeople in the debate were Che Guevara who argued for an independent Cuban model to communism, and Carlos Rafael Rodríguez of the Popular Socialist Party who advocated for more of a "soviet" model towards communism which meant a development of capitalism before socialism and later communism.

This "Great Debate" came to an end when Guevara left Cuba in 1965. Initially, his view lost support. In 1968, however, Fidel Castro announced the reforms of the Revolutionary Offensive which drew on Guevara's ideas.

=== Militarization of labor ===
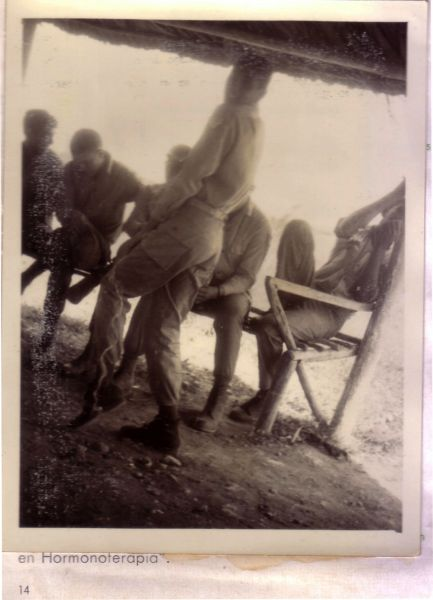
Sexual reorientation therapy at a Cuban UMAP camp. (1967)

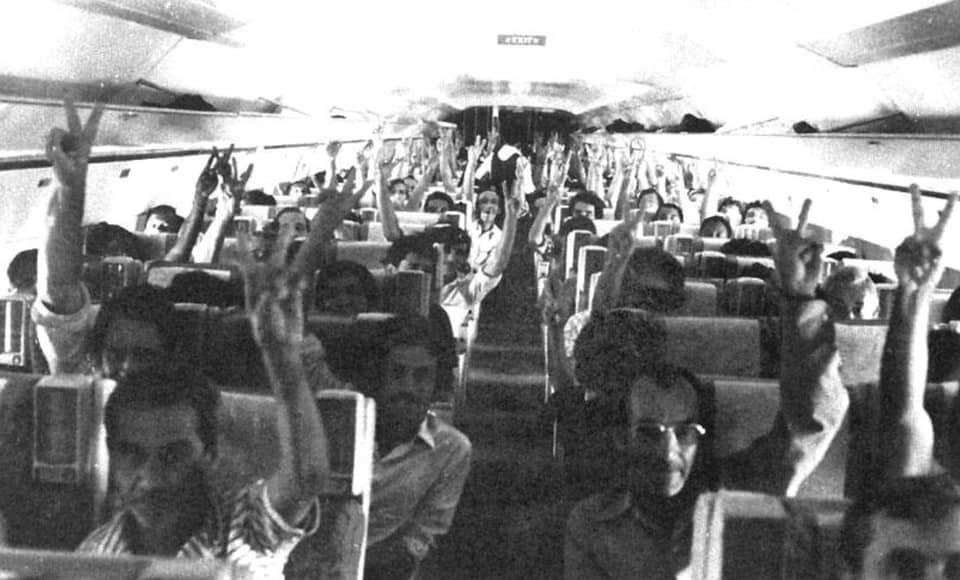
Refugees on a Freedom Flight in 1971.

Military Units to Aid Production or UMAPs (Unidades Militares para la Ayuda de Producción) – in effect, forced labor concentration camps – were established in 1965 as a way to eliminate alleged "bourgeois" and "counter-revolutionary" values in the Cuban population. The creation of the UMAP camps themselves was initially proposed by Fidel Castro and implemented by his brother Raúl Castro after a state visit to the Soviet Union and Bulgaria, where he learned that the Soviets ran camps for "anti-socials." According to an April 14, 1966 article in Granma, the official state newspaper, UMAP camps were proposed at a November 1965 meeting between Fidel Castro and military leaders. Both were concerned over how to handle "misplaced elements."

On 6 November 1965, Cuba and the United States agreed to an airlift for Cubans who wanted to emigrate to the United States. The first of these Freedom Flights left Cuba on 1 December 1965. Emigrants were often forced to serve in labor camps before departure, and all their property was confiscated before their exit from Cuba.

In 1968, the "Revolutionary Offensive" was announced, as a campaign to nationalize all remaining private small businesses, which at the time totaled to be about 58,000 small enterprises. The campaign would spur industrialization in Cuba and focus the economy on sugar production, specifically to a deadline for an annual sugar harvest of 10 million tons by 1970. The economic focus on sugar production involved international volunteers and the mobilization of workers from all sectors of the Cuban economy. Economic mobilization also coincided with greater militarization of Cuban political structures and the Cuban workforce in general, which was put under military command. Some of the small merchants whose enterprises were nationalized in the offensive chose to leave Cuba in the "Freedom Flights" airlift. By 1971, over 250,000 Cubans in general, had flown to the United States in the Freedom Flights.

=== Political institutionalization ===
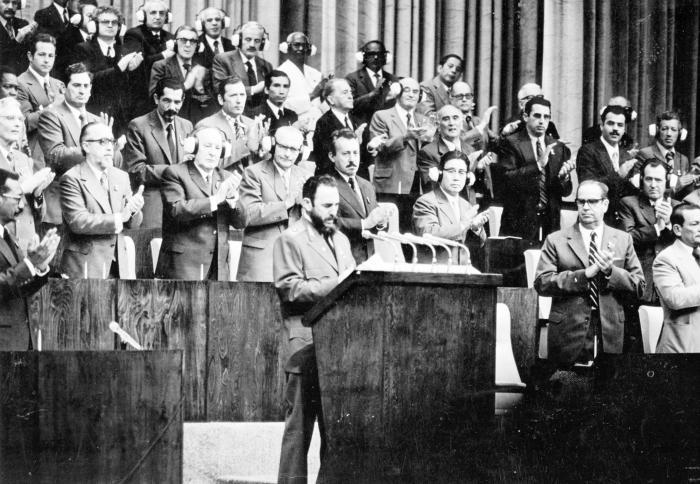
Fidel Castro at the first congress of the Communist Party of Cuba

By the 1970s, the standard of living in Cuba was "extremely spartan" and discontent was rife. Castro changed economic policies in the first half of the 1970s. In the 1970s unemployment reappeared as problem. The solution was to criminalize unemployment with 1971 Anti-Loafing Law; the unemployed would be jailed.

After 1971, Cuba entered its "grey years:, which are a loosely defined period in Cuban history, generally agreed to have started with the Padilla affair in 1971. The "grey years" are often associated with the tenure of Luis Pavón Tamayo (de) as the head of Cuba's National Cultural Council ("Consejo Nacional de Cuba", or CNC) from 1971 to 1976. The grey years were generally defined by cultural censorship, harassment of intellectuals and artists, and the ostracization of members of the LGBT+ community. Greater monetary influence from the Soviet Union during this time period pressured Cuba into adopting a model of cultural repression that was reflected in Cuba's domestic policy throughout the 1970s.

A period of institutionalization was kickstarted by the first official congress of the Communist Party of Cuba in December 1975. The meeting approved the development of a "System of Direction for Economic Planning" (SDPE), which was modeled on Soviet economic planning and prioritized profit making. The implementation of the SDPE took ten years. In 1976, a new constitution was also approved. The constitution was modeled off the Soviet system, and introduced the National Assembly of People's Power as the institution of indirect representation in government.

=== Involvement in Third World conflicts ===
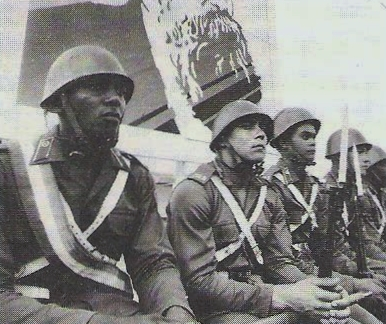
Soldiers of FAR

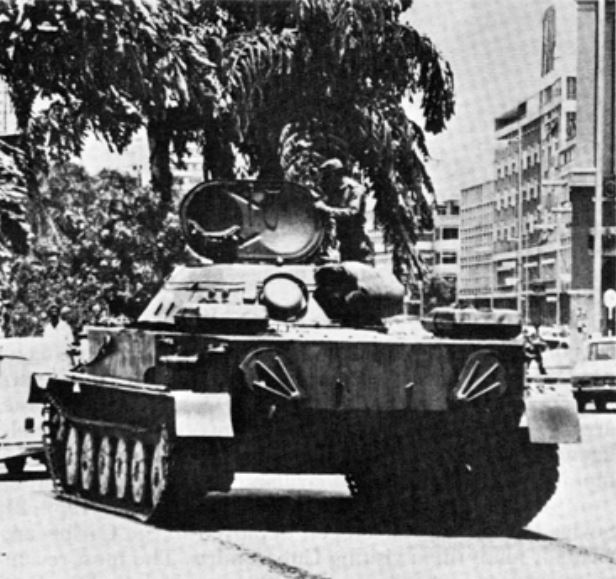
Cuban PT-76 tank crew on routine security duties in Angola

From its inception, the Cuban Revolution defined itself as internationalist, seeking to spread its revolutionary ideals abroad and gain foreign allies. Although still a developing country itself, Cuba supported African, Latin American and Asian countries in the fields of military development, health and education. These "overseas adventures" not only irritated the United States but were also quite often a source of dispute with Cuba's ostensible allies in the Kremlin.

The Sandinista insurgency in Nicaragua, which led to the demise of the Somoza dictatorship in 1979, was openly supported by Cuba. However, it was on the African continent where Cuba was most active, supporting a total of 17 liberation movements or leftist governments, in countries including Angola, Equatorial Guinea, Ethiopia, Guinea-Bissau, and Mozambique. Cuba offered to send troops to Vietnam, but the initiative was turned down by the Vietnamese.

Cuba had some 39,000–40,000 military personnel abroad by the late 1970s, with the bulk of the forces in Sub-Saharan Africa but with some 1,365 stationed among Algeria, Iraq, Libya, and South Yemen. By 1982, Cuba possessed the best equipped and largest per capita armed forces in Latin America. Moscow used Cuban surrogate troops in Africa and the Middle East because they had a high level of training for combat in Third World environments, familiarity with Soviet weapons, physical toughness and a tradition of successful guerrilla warfare dating back to the uprisings against Spain in the 19th century. An estimated 7,000–11,000 Cubans died in conflicts in Africa.

As early as 1961, Cuba supported the National Liberation Front in Algeria against France. In 1964, Cuba supported the Simba Rebellion of adherents of Patrice Lumumba in Congo-Leopoldville (present-day Democratic Republic of the Congo). Some 40–50 Cubans fought against Portugal in Guinea-Bissau each year from 1966 until independence in 1974. In late 1973, there were 4,000 Cuban tank troops in Syria as part of an armored brigade which took part in the Yom Kippur War until May 1974.

Its involvement in the Angolan Civil War was particularly intense and noteworthy with heavy assistance given to the Marxist–Leninist MPLA. At the height of its operation, Cuba had as many as 50,000 soldiers stationed in Angola. Cuban soldiers were instrumental in the defeat of South African and Zairian troops and the establishment of Namibia. Cuban soldiers also defeated the FNLA and UNITA armies and established MPLA control over most of Angola. South African Defence Force soldiers were again drawn into the Angolan Civil War in 1987–88, and several inconclusive battles were fought between Cuban and South African forces. Cuban-piloted MiG-23s performed airstrikes against South African forces in South West Africa during the Battle of Cuito Cuanavale. Cuba's presence in Mozambique was more subdued, involving by the mid-1980s 700 Cuban military and 70 civilian personnel. In 1978, in Ethiopia, 16,000 Cuban combatants, along with the Soviet-supported Ethiopian Army, defeated an invasion force of Somalians. The execution of civilians and refugees, and rape of women by the Ethiopian and Cuban troops was prevalent throughout the war. (Note: Cuba lost 400 killed in the conventional war, but its heaviest casualties came in the irregular war that followed. From March 1978 to November 1979, irregular hostilities claimed, according to the WSLF, 60,000 lives, including 25,000 civilians and 6,000 Cuban soldiers supporting the Ethiopians.) Assisted by Soviet advisors, the Cubans launched a second offensive in December 1979 directed at the population's means of survival, including the poisoning and destruction of wells and the killing of cattle herds. Cuba was unable to pay on its own for the costs of its overseas military activities. After it lost its subsidies from the USSR, Cuba withdrew its troops from Ethiopia (1989), Nicaragua (1990), Angola (1991), and elsewhere.

=== Mariel boatlift ===
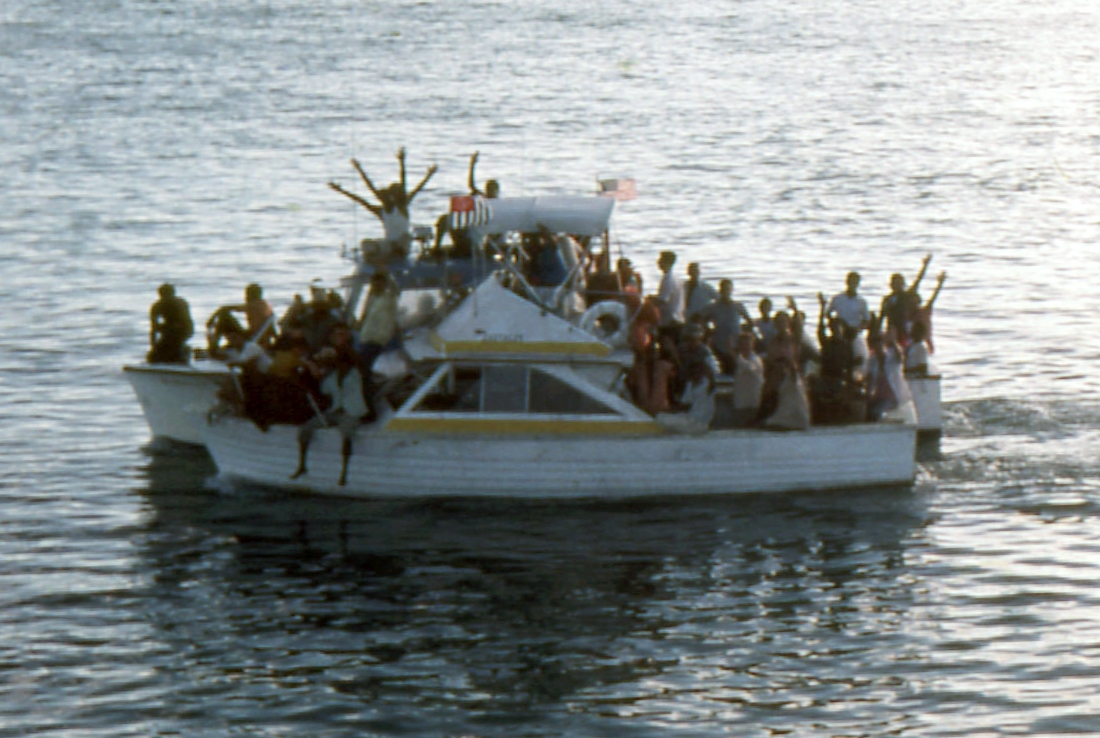
Mariel refugees on boat to Florida (1980)

Several attempts by Cubans to seek asylum at the embassies of South American countries set the stage for the events of the spring of 1980. On 21 March 1978, two young Cuban writers who had been punished for dissent and denied permission to emigrate, Reynaldo Colas Pineda and Esteban Luis Cárdenas Junquera, unsuccessfully sought asylum in the Argentine embassy in Havana and were sentenced to two years in prison. On May 13, 1979, 12 Cubans sought to take asylum in the Venezuelan embassy in Havana by crashing their bus through a fence to gain entry to the grounds and the building. In January 1980, groups of asylum seekers took refuge in the Peruvian and Venezuelan embassies, and Venezuela called its ambassador home for consultations to protest that they had been fired on by the Cuban police. In March, Peru recalled its ambassador, who had denied entry to a dozen Cubans who were seeking asylum in his embassy. The embassy invasions then became a confrontation between the Cuban government and the Havana embassies. A group of Cubans attempted to enter the Peruvian embassy in the last week of March, and on April 1, a group of six driving a city bus was successful in doing so, and a Cuban guard was killed by a ricocheting bullet. The Peruvians announced that they would not hand those who were seeking asylum over to Cuban police. The embassy grounds contained two 2-story buildings and gardens covering an area the size of a US football field, or 6,400 square yards

Castro stated ultimately on 20 April that the port of Mariel would be opened to anyone wishing to leave Cuba if they had someone to pick them up. Soon after Castro's decree, many Cuban Americans began making arrangements to pick up refugees in the harbor. On April 21, the first boat from the harbor docked in Key West and held 48 refugees. By April 25 as many as 300 boats were picking up refugees in Mariel Harbor. Cuban officials also packed refugees into Cuban fishing vessels. Around 1,700 boats brought thousands of Cubans from Mariel to Florida between the months of April and October in that year.

=== Rectification process ===
In February 1986, at the Congress of the Communist Party of Cuba, Castro proclaimed: "Now, we are going to build socialism". Castro criticized material incentives for laborers. Over the next months continued to criticize the Cuban bureaucracy and laziness. Economic reforms also included restructurings of party management. In 1986, the System of Direction for Economic Planning was made to obey the command of the Politboro of the Communist Party of Cuba.

On October 8, 1987, at the anniversary of Che Guevara's death, Castro gave a speech inferring Guevara would be horrified at the bureaucracy in Cuba, and the lack of patriotic enthusiasm of common workers.

Throughout the rectification process, private businesses became more heavily regulated, farmers markets were banned, material incentives were ended, and the minimum wage was increased.

=== Special Period ===
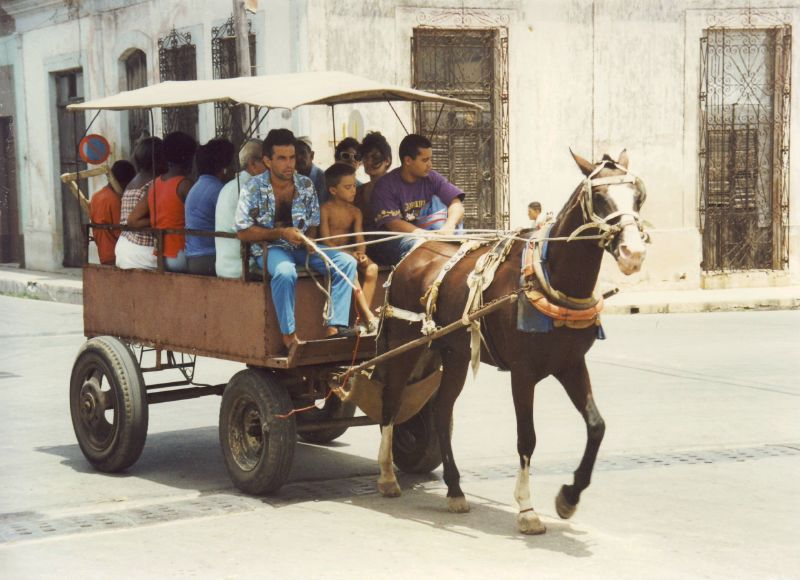
Public transportation in Cuba during the "Special Period"

Starting from the mid-1980s, Cuba experienced a crisis referred to as the "Special Period". When the Soviet Union was dissolved in late 1991, a major supporter of Cuba's economy was lost, leaving it essentially paralyzed because of the economy's narrow basis, focused on just a few products with just a few buyers. National oil supplies, which were mostly imported, were severely reduced. Over 80% of Cuba's trade was lost and living conditions declined. A "Special Period in Peacetime" was declared, which included cutbacks on transport and electricity and even food rationing. In response, the United States tightened its trade embargo, hoping it would lead to Castro's downfall. But the government tapped into a pre-revolutionary source of income and opened the country to tourism, entering into several joint ventures with foreign companies for hotel, agricultural and industrial projects. As a result, the use of U.S. dollars was legalized in 1994, with special stores being opened which only sold in dollars. There were two separate economies, dollar-economy and the peso-economy, creating a social split in the island because those in the dollar-economy made much more money. However, in October 2004, the Cuban government announced an end to this policy: from November U.S. dollars would no longer be legal tender, but would instead be exchanged for convertible pesos with a 10% tax payable to the state on the exchange of U.S. dollars.

A Canadian Medical Association Journal paper states that "The famine in Cuba during the Special Period was caused by political and economic factors similar to the ones that caused a famine in North Korea in the mid-1990s. Both countries were run by authoritarian regimes that denied ordinary people the food to which they were entitled when the public food distribution collapsed; priority was given to the elite classes and the military." The government did not accept American donations of food, medicines and money until 1993, forcing many Cubans to eat anything they could find. Even domestic cats were reportedly eaten.

Extreme food shortages and electrical blackouts led to a brief period of unrest, including numerous anti-government protests and widespread increases in urban crime. In response, the Cuban Communist Party formed hundreds of "rapid-action brigades" to confront protesters. The Communist Party's publication Granma stated that "delinquents and anti-social elements who try to create disorder ... will receive a crushing reply from the people". In July 1994, 41 Cubans drowned attempting to flee the country aboard a tugboat; the Cuban government was later accused of sinking the vessel deliberately.

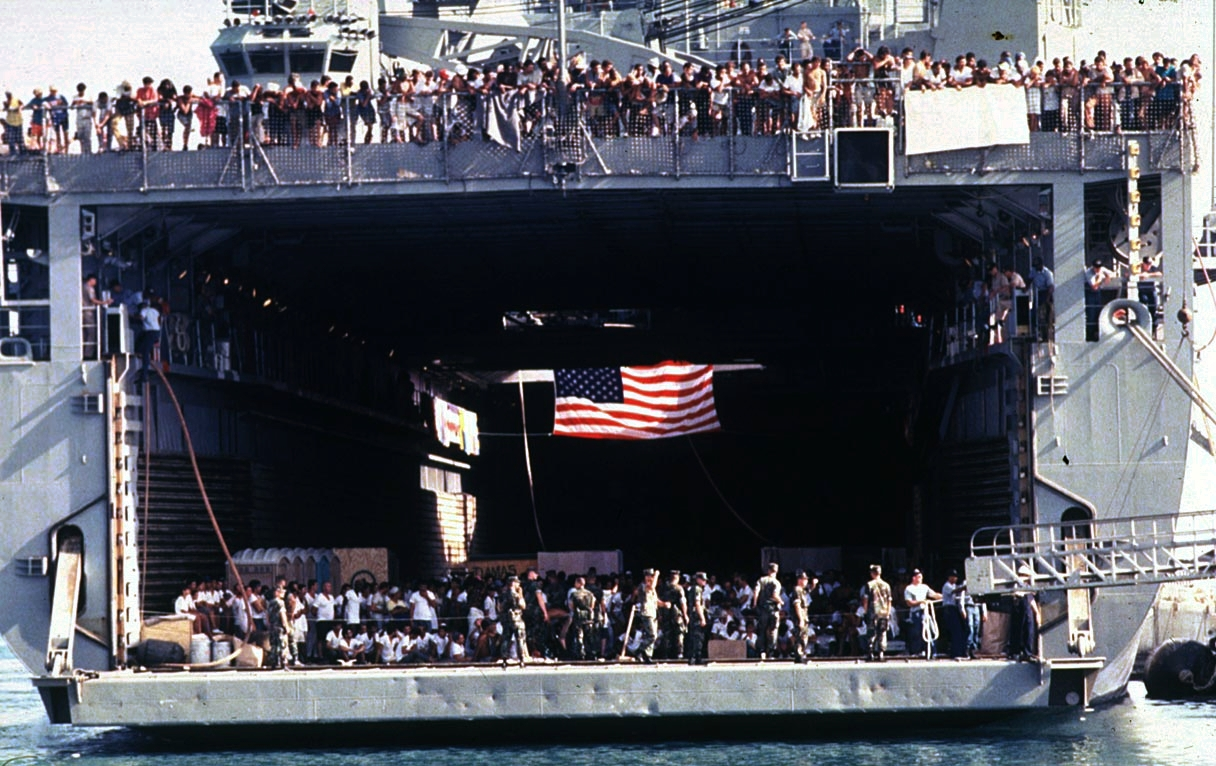
Cuban refugees picked up at sea by the USS USS Whibdey Island

Thousands of Cubans protested in Havana during the Maleconazo uprising on 5 August 1994. However, the regime's security forces swiftly dispersed them. After the Maleconazo riots, Fidel Castro announced that any Cubans who wished to leave the island could. Around 5,000 rafters had left earlier in the year but after the announcement around 33,000 rafters left the island. U.S. President Bill Clinton would announce that any rafters intercepted at sea would be detained at Guantanamo Bay Naval Base. Around 200,000 rafters would be detained at the base.

=== Recovery and new diplomacy ===
Although contacts between Cubans and foreign visitors were made legal in 1997, extensive censorship had isolated it from the rest of the world. In 1997, a group led by Vladimiro Roca, son of the founder of the Cuban Communist Party, sent a petition, entitled La Patria es de Todos ("the homeland belongs to all") to the Cuban general assembly, requesting democratic and human rights reforms. Roca and his associates were imprisoned but were eventually released. I

Though it was largely diplomatically isolated from the West at this time, Cuba nonetheless cultivated regional allies. After the rise to power of Hugo Chávez in Venezuela in 1999, Cuba and Venezuela formed an increasingly close relationship.

In December 1999, during a Federation of University Students meeting, a student announced a spontaneous march to the Office of American Interests in Havana to demand the return of Elián González. A few days after the march the "Group of the Battle of Ideas" was formed by the Young Communist League and the Federation of University Students. The group began organizing demonstrations across Cuba for the return of Elián González. After González's return, the group began regularly meeting with Fidel Castro to oversee various construction projects and government meetings in Cuba. Fidel Castro ensured that the group had special authorities, and could bypass the approval of various ministries. What followed was a political campaign titled the "Battle of Ideas", which focused on human development, and youth mobilization. Various improvement projects were conducted in regards to education and healthcare. Cuba also began forging closer diplomatic ties with Pink tide governments, often providing them medical services. Over 30,000 health workers would be deployed overseas by 2007.

In 2001, a group of Cuban activists collected thousands of signatures for the Varela Project, a petition requesting a referendum on the island's political process, which was openly supported by former U.S. President Jimmy Carter. The petition gathered sufficient signatures to be considered by the Cuban government, but was rejected on an alleged technicality. Instead, a plebiscite was held in which it was formally proclaimed that Castro's brand of socialism would be perpetual.

In 2003, Castro cracked down on independent journalists and other dissidents in an episode which became known as the "Black Spring". The government imprisoned 75 dissident thinkers, including journalists, librarians, human rights activists, and democracy activists, on the basis that they were acting as agents of the United States by accepting aid from the U.S. government.

== Government of Raul Castro (2007–2020) ==
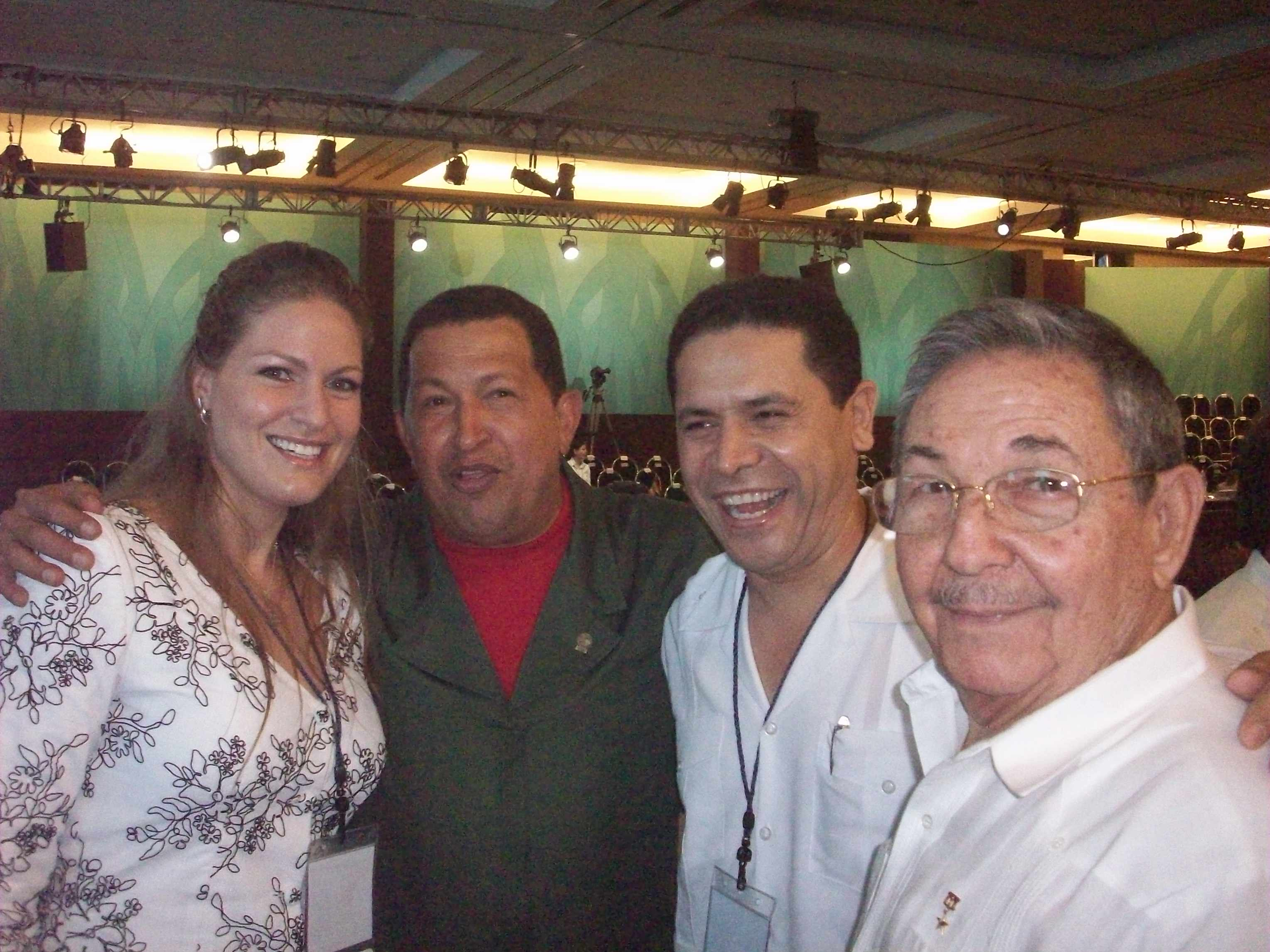
Raul Castro (far right), with Hugo Chavez (middle left), in 2010

=== Transfer of power ===
In 2006, Fidel Castro fell ill and withdrew from public life. The following year, Raúl Castro became Acting President. In a letter dated 18 February 2008, Fidel Castro announced his formal resignation, saying "I will not aspire nor accept...the post of President of the Council of State and Commander in Chief." In 2008, Cuba was struck by three separate hurricanes, in the most destructive hurricane season in the country's history; over 200,000 were left homeless, and over US$5 billion of property damage was caused.

=== Improving foreign relations ===
In July 2012, Cuba received its first American goods shipment in over 50 years, following the partial relaxation of the U.S. embargo to permit humanitarian shipments. In October 2012, Cuba announced the abolition of its much-disliked exit permit system, allowing its citizens more freedom to travel abroad. In February 2013, after his reelection as president, Raúl Castro stated that he would retire from government in 2018 as part of a broader leadership transition. In July 2013, Cuba became embroiled in a diplomatic scandal after Chong Chon Gang, a North Korean ship illegally carrying Cuban weapons, was impounded by Panama.

The severe economic strife suffered by Venezuela in the mid-2010s lessened its ability to support Cuba, and may ultimately have contributed to the thawing of Cuban-American relations. In December 2014, after a highly publicized exchange of political prisoners between the United States and Cuba, U.S. President Barack Obama announced plans to re-establish diplomatic relations, establish an embassy in Havana and improve economic ties. Obama's proposal received both strong criticism and praise from different elements of the Cuban American community. In April 2015, the U.S. government announced that Cuba would be removed from its list of state sponsors of terrorism. The U.S. embassy in Havana was formally reopened in August 2015. In 2017, staffing levels at the embassy were reduced following unexplained health incidents.

=== Economic reforms ===
As of 2015, Cuba remains one of the few officially socialist states in the world. Though it remains diplomatically isolated and afflicted by economic inefficiency, major currency reforms were begun in the 2010s, and efforts to free up domestic private enterprise are now underway. Living standards in the country have improved significantly since the turmoil of the Special Period, with GDP per capita in terms of purchasing power parity rising from less than US$2,000 in 1999 to nearly $10,000 in 2010. Tourism has furthermore become a significant source of prosperity for Cuba.

Despite the reforms, Cuba remains afflicted by chronic shortages of food and medicines. The electrical and water services are still unreliable. In July 2021, protests erupted over these problems and the government's response to the COVID-19 pandemic, but primarily because of the historical government oppression, profound lack of opportunities, and repression of personal liberties.

== Leadership of Diaz-Canel (2021–present) ==
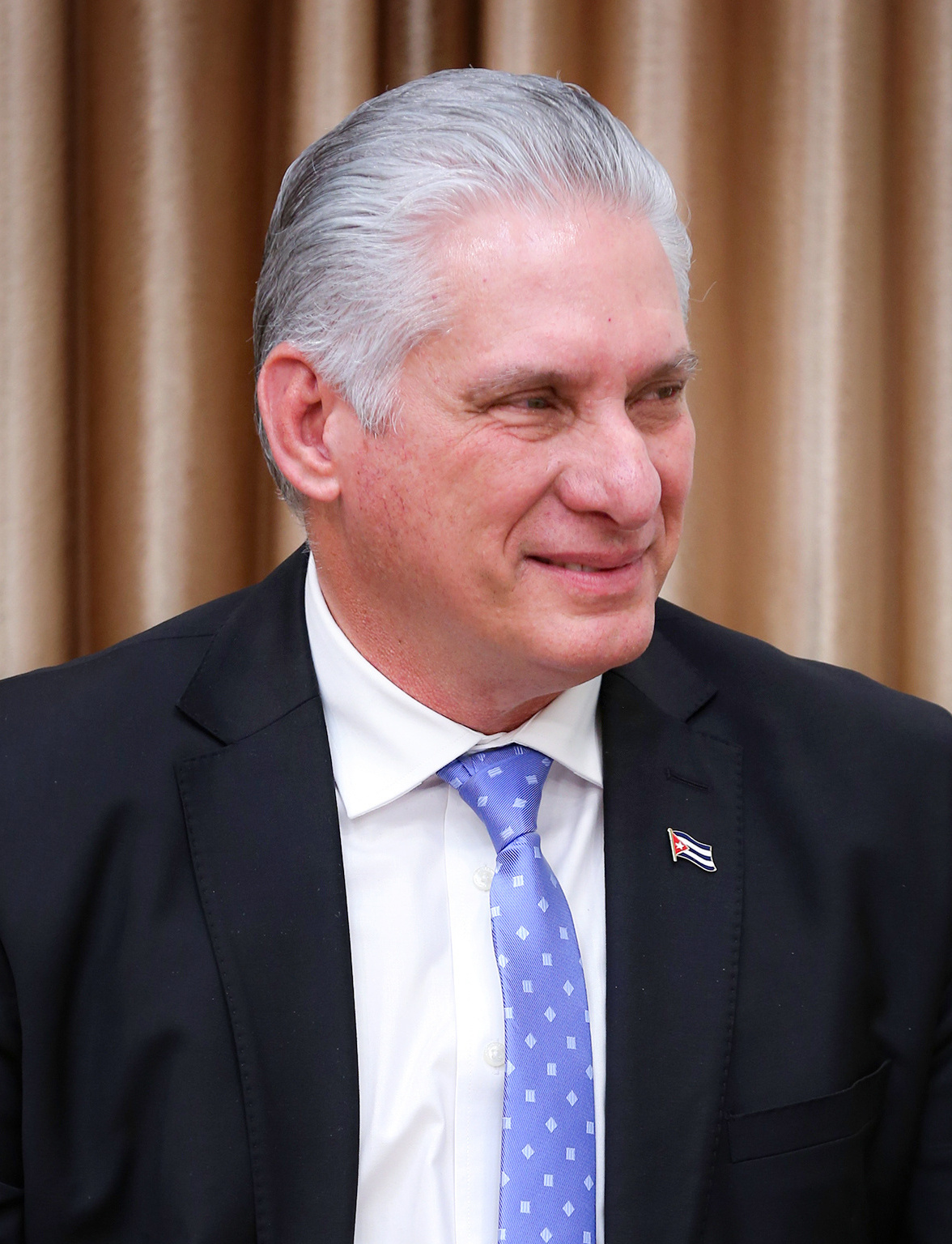
Photo of Cuban leader Miguel Díaz-Canel in 2023

Fidel Castro was succeeded both as the first secretary of the ruling Communist party in 2011 and as the president of State Council in 2008 by his brother, Raúl Castro. In 2018, Miguel Díaz-Canel took over from Raúl Castro as president. In April 2021, Díaz-Canel succeeded Raúl Castro also as the First Secretary of the Communist Party of Cuba, the most powerful position in Cuba. He is the first person to hold both the Cuban presidency and the leadership of the Communist Party (PCC) without being a member of the Castro family.

A series of protests against the Cuban government and the Communist Party of Cuba began on 11 July 2021, triggered by a shortage of food and medicine and the government's response to the resurgent COVID-19 pandemic in Cuba. The protests were the largest anti-government demonstrations since the Maleconazo in 1994.

From 2021 onward, there has been a significant surge of Cuban nationals leaving the country, mostly to the United States, due to a combination of factors, including economic hardships and political uncertainties in their homeland. The crisis has resulted in a notable increase in Cuban encounters at the United States' southern border, with many attempting to cross into the country through both regular border crossings and sea arrivals, particularly in South Florida. The mass exodus has posed humanitarian, social, and political challenges for both Cuba and the U.S., prompting discussions and negotiations between the two nations to address the crisis and manage the flow of migrants. It has been described as the largest mass emigration in Cuba's history. It is estimated that nearly 500,000 Cubans sought refuge into the United States between 2021 and 2023, accounting for nearly 5% of Cuba's population. It is estimated that 60% of the new Cuban arrival between 2021 and 2023 (300,000), have settled in Miami-Dade County.

On 3 January 2026, 32 Cuban troops were killed in Venezuela during the 2026 United States intervention in Venezuela. It was the biggest loss of Cuban combatants by the US military since the Bay of Pigs invasion in April 1961. After the intervention in Venezuela, in which U.S. forces ousted Venezuelan president Nicolás Maduro, the resulting blockade of Venezuelan oil destined for Cuba left the island without adequate supply. On 29 January 2026, Executive Order 14380 was signed by US President Donald Trump and entered into force on 30 January, declaring a national emergency in U.S. and authorizing the imposition of additional tariffs on imports into the United States from countries that directly or indirectly supply oil to Cuba. This triggered severe fuel crisis in Cuda, with frequent blackouts, shortages of gasoline and cooking gas In June 2026, the Office of the United Nations High Commissioner for Human Rights (OHCHR) warned of the humanitarian consequences of US sanctions, stating that infant mortality had doubled to 9.9 deaths per 1,000 live births, childhood cancer survival rates had fallen from 85 to 65 per cent, and essential medicines were available at only around 30 per cent of their normal supply levels. OHCHR also stated that fuel shortages had reduced food production by 60 per cent, while the cost of basic foodstuffs had risen sharply.

== See also ==
- History of Cuban nationality
- History of Latin America
- History of the Caribbean
- List of colonial governors of Cuba
- List of Cuba hurricanes
- List of heads of state of Cuba
- Military history of Cuba
- Politics of Cuba
- Spanish colonization of the Americas
- Spanish Empire – Colonial empire between 1492 and 1976
- Timeline of Cuban history

== Bibliography and further reading ==
- Castillo Ramos, Ruben (1956). "Muerto Edesio, El rey de la Sierra Maestra". Bohemia XLVIII No. 9 (12 August 1956). pp. 52–54, 87.
- Chomsky, Aviva; Carr, Barry; Smorkaloff, Pamela Maria, eds. (2004). The Cuba Reader: History, Culture, Politics. Durham, NC & London: Duke University Press.
- Clodfelter, M. (2017). Warfare and Armed Conflicts: A Statistical Encyclopedia of Casualty and Other Figures, 1492–2015 (4th ed.). Jefferson, North Carolina: McFarland. ISBN 978-0786474707.
- De Paz Sánchez, Manuel Antonio; Fernández, José; López, Nelson (1993–1994). El bandolerismo en Cuba (1800–1933). Presencia canaria y protesta rural. Santa Cruz de Tenerife. Two volumes.
- Foner, Philip S. (1962). A History of Cuba and its Relations with the United States.
- Franklin, James (1997). Cuba and the United States: A Chronological History. Ocean Press.
- Gleijeses, Piero (2002). Conflicting Missions: Havana, Washington, and Africa, 1959–1976. University of North Carolina Press. 552 pp.
- Gott, Richard. (2004). Cuba: A New History.
- Hernández, Rafael and Coatsworth, John H., eds. (2001). Culturas Encontradas: Cuba y los Estados Unidos. Harvard University Press. 278 pp.
- Hernández, José M. (1993). Cuba and the United States: Intervention and Militarism, 1868–1933. University of Texas Press. 288 pp.
- Johnson, Willis Fletcher (1920). The History of Cuba. New York: B.F. Buck & Company, Inc.
- Kapcia, Antoni. (2021) A Short History of Revolutionary Cuba: Revolution, Power, Authority and the State from 1959 to the Present Day
- Kirk, John M. and McKenna, Peter (1997). Canada–Cuba Relations: The Other Good Neighbor Policy. University Press of Florida. 207 pp.
- McPherson, Alan (2003). Yankee No! Anti-Americanism in U.S.–Latin American Relations. Harvard University Press. 257 pp.
- Morley, Morris H. and McGillian, Chris. Unfinished Business: America and Cuba after the Cold War, 1989–2001. Cambridge University Press. 253 pp.
- Offner, John L. (2002). An Unwanted War: The Diplomacy of the United States and Spain over Cuba, 1895–1898. University of North Carolina Press, 1992. 306 pp.
- Paterson, Thomas G. (1994). Contesting Castro: The United States and the Triumph of the Cuban Revolution. Oxford University Press. 352 pp.
- Pérez, Louis A., Jr. (1998). The War of 1898: The United States and Cuba in History and Historiography. University of North Carolina Press. 192 pp.
- Pérez, Louis A. (1990). Cuba and the United States: Ties of Singular Intimacy. University of Georgia Press. 314 pp.
- Perez, Louis A. (1989). Lords of the Mountain: Social Banditry and Peasant Protest in Cuba, 1878–1918. Pitt Latin American Series: University of Pittsburgh Press. ISBN 0-8229-3601-1.
- Schwab, Peter (1999). Cuba: Confronting the U.S. Embargo. New York: St. Martin's. 226 pp.
- Staten, Clifford L. (2005). The History of Cuba. Palgrave Essential Histories.
- Thomas, Hugh (1998). Cuba or the Pursuit of Freedom. ISBN 978-0-306-80827-2.
- Tone, John Lawrence (2006). War and Genocide in Cuba, 1895–1898.
- Walker, Daniel E. (2004). No More, No More: Slavery and Cultural Resistance in Havana and New Orleans. University of Minnesota Press. 188 pp.
- Whitney, Robert W. (2001). State and Revolution in Cuba: Mass Mobilization and Political Change, 1920–1940. Chapel Hill and London: University of North Carolina Press. ISBN 0-8078-2611-1.
- Zeuske, Michael (2004). Insel der Extreme: Kuba im 20. Jahrhundert. Zürich: Rotpunktverlag. ISBN 3-85869-208-5.
- Zeuske, Michael (2004). Schwarze Karibik: Sklaven, Sklavereikulturen und Emanzipation. Zürich: Rotpunktverlag. ISBN 3-85869-272-7.
- Danielle Bleitrach, Viktor Dedaj, Jacques-François Bonaldi. Cuba est une île, Cuba es una isla, Le Temps des cerises, 2004. ISBN 978-2-8410-9499-8.
