= List of people on the postage stamps of Cuba =

This article lists people who have been featured on Cuban postage stamps. Note that many of these people have been featured on multiple stamps. The following entries list the name of the person, the first year they were first featured on a stamp, and a short description of their notability.

The list is complete through 2014.

== A ==
- Angel Arturo Aballi, physician (1958)
- Eduardo Agramonte, physician and revolutionary (1972)
- Ignacio Agramonte, revolution leader (1910)
- Joaquín de Agüero, freedom fighter and patriot (1957)
- Julián Aguirre, Argentina charango musician (1991)
- José María Aguirre, general (1956)
- Miguel Aldama, Cuban politician (1956)
- Eloy Alfaro Delgado, president of Ecuador (1943)
- Alfonso XII of Spain, king of Spain (1876)
- Alfonso XIII of Spain, king of Spain (1890)
- Salvador Allende, president of Chile (1974)
- Tony Aloma, revolution leader (1966)
- Daniel Alomia, Peru flute musician (1991)
- Alonso de Ojeda, Spanish navigator, governor and conquistador (1992)
- Alicia Alonso, ballet dancer (2006)
- Dora Alonso, writer (2010)
- Fernando Alonso, ballet director (2012)
- Alonso Alvarez de la Campa, medical student (1952)
- Paulina Álvarez, singer (2012)
- Santiago Álvarez, filmmaker (2009 )
- Amadeo I, king of Spain (1873)
- Ángel Ameijeiras Delgado, Cuban revolutionary fighter (1998)
- Jorge Ankermann, Cuban composer (1966)
- Rey Vincente Anglada, Cuban baseball player (2004)
- Vincenta Antonio de Castro, physician (1958)
- Carlos Aponte, revolutionary (1985)
- Manuel José Arce, El Salvador Independence leader (1988)
- Marta Abreu Arenabio de Estévez, philanthropist and humanitarian (1947)
- José Gervasio Artigas, national hero of Uruguay (1988)
- Miguel Asturias, Guatemalan writer (1989)
- Atlácatl, last ruler of Cuzcatlan, El Salvador (1937)

== B ==
- Johann Sebastian Bach, German composer and musician (1997)
- Robert Baden-Powell, creator of the Boy Scouts (1957)
- Manuel Balanzategui, postal clerk (1950)
- Quintin Bandera, military leader (1996)
- Enrique B. Barnet, public health expert (1952)
- Bartholomew of Constantinople, archbishop of the Greek Orthodox Church (2013)
- Ludwig van Beethoven, German composer (1997)
- Juan B. Hernandez Barreiro, lawyer (1958)
- Bartolomé de las Casas, Spanish historian, social reformer and Dominican friar (1944)
- Hortense de Beauharnais, queen of Holland (1969)
- Pavel I. Belyayev, cosmonaut (1965)
- Mario Benedetti, writer (2013)
- Benedict XVI, pope (2012)
- Anacleto Bermudez, medical student (1952)
- Ramón Emeterio Betances, doctor and revolution leader (1968)
- Salvador Cisneros Betancourt, president (1959)
- Conrado Benitez, educator (1981)
- Hubert de Blanck, composer (1956)
- Jose D. Blino, aviation pioneer (1970)
- Humphrey Bogart, actor (1995)
- Simón Bolívar, liberator of Venezuela (1937)
- Francisco Bolognesi, Peruvian military hero (1988)
- Elisa Bonaparte, princess of Lucca and Piombino (1969)
- Napoleon Bonaparte, emperor of France (1969)
- Bernardo Juan Borrell, rebel leader (1964)
- Leonid Illyich Brezhnev, General Secretary of the Communist Party of the Soviet Union (1974)
- Antonio Briones Montoto, guerrilla (2012)
- Tamara "Tania" Bunke, revolutionary (1972)
- Richard Burton, film star (2001)
- Valery F. Bykovsky, cosmonaut (1963)
- Bonifacio Byrne, poet (1986)

== C ==
- Eduardo Caba, Bolivia composer and antara musician (1991)
- Amílcar Cabral, Guinea-Bissau revolutionary (1974)
- Pedro Álvares Cabral, Portuguese navigator and explorer (1992)
- Maria Magdalena Cabrales, aided Cuban revolution (1998)
- Francisco Cajigal de la Vega, governor of Cuba (1956)
- Cantinflas, Mexican comic film actor, producer, and screenwriter (1995)
- José Raúl Capablanca, world chess titlist (1951)
- Federico Capdevila, defense lawyer (1952)
- Enrique Caravia, artist (1951)
- Carlos III, king of Spain (1972)
- Alejo Carpentier, Cuban writer (1989)
- Francisco Carrillo, Major General of the Cuban Liberation Army (1955)
- Julián del Casal, poet and writer (1956)
- Luis G. Casanova, Cuban baseball player (2004)
- Luis de Las Casas, governor-general of Cuba (1945)
- Cascarita, Cuban singer (2004)
- Adolfo del Castillo Sánchez, general (1997)
- Ricardo Castillo, Guatemala composer (1991)
- Fidel Castro, president (1974)
- Raúl Castro, Cuban president (2012)
- Catherine of Alexandria, saint (1971)
- Alejandro G. Caturia, Cuban composer (1966)
- Juan P. Cebreco, general of the army of liberation (1957)
- José Cecilio del Valle, Honduran writer (1989)
- Ignacio Cervantes, musician (1958)
- Miguel de Cervantes, author of Don Quixote (2005)
- Ismael de Céspedes, director of the Bayamo telegraph (1949)
- Jose Maria Chacon y Calvo, historian (1992)
- Tomas Romay Chacón, physician (1958)
- Charlie Chaplin, actor and director (1995)
- Carlos Chávez, México guitar musician (1991)
- Hugo Chávez, president of Venezuela (2014)
- Eduardo Chibás, Cuban politician (2001)
- Frédéric Chopin, Polish composer (1997)
- Saint Christopher, (1971)
- Camilo Cienfuegos, revolutionary hero (1960)
- Jacqueline Cochran, female aviator (2011)
- Nat King Cole, singer (2013)
- Emelina Collazo, sister of Guillermo Collazo (1976)
- Enrique Collazo, general (1950)
- Guillermo Collazo, painter and advocate for independence (1976)
- Boris Luis Santa Coloma, revolutionary (1983)
- Christopher Columbus, discover of America (1899, 1944)
- Gabriel de la Concepción Valdés Plácido, poet (1946)
- Juan Corzo, chess master (1988)
- Pierre de Coubertin, founder of the modern Olympics (1984)
- Adolfo Flor Crombet, general (1959)
- Jaime González Crocier, pilot (1955)
- Julio Cueva, Cuban trumpeter, composer and band leader (2004)
- Miguelito Cuni, singer (2007)
- Marie Curie, physical chemist (1994)
- Pierre Curie, chemist (1994)

== D ==
- Rubén Darío, Nicaraguan poet (1937)
- Charles Darwin, English naturalist and geologist (1996)
- James Dean, film star (2001)
- Luis A. Delgadillo, Nicaragua maracas musician (1991)
- Juan Delgado González, Cuban patriot (2013)
- Alberto Delgado Delgado, undercover agent (2014)
- Claudio Delgado, physician (1965)
- Martín Morúa Delgado, patriot (1956)
- Jean-Jacques Dessalines, leader of the Haitian Revolution (1988)
- Diana, Princess of Wales (1998)
- Bartolomeu Dias, Portuguese explorer (1992)
- José Eduvigis Díaz Vera, Paraguayan general (1988)
- Marlene Dietrich, actress (1995)
- Martín Dihigo, Cuban baseball player (2004)
- Georgi Dimitrov, prime minister of Bulgaria (1982)
- Lidia Doce, revolutionary (1965)
- María Luisa Dolz, educator and defender of women's rights (1954)
- Manuel Ascunce Domenech, educator (1975)
- Juan Pablo Duarte, founding father of the Dominican Republic (1988)
- D. Castillo Duany, general of the army of liberation (1957)
- Vidal Ducasse Reeve, brigadier general (1997)
- Manuel Duchesne Cuzán, general director of the National Symphonic Orchestra (2010)

== E ==
- Amelia Earhart, female aviator (2011)
- Jose A. Echeverria, guerrilla (1963)
- Albert Einstein, physicist and mathematician (1994)
- Ruth Elder, female aviator (2011)
- Nicolás Ruiz Espadero, musician (1958)
- Vilma Espin Guillois, wife of Fidel Castro (2008)
- Nicolás Estévanez, military officer, politician and poet (1952)
- José Dolores Estrada, Nicaraguan national hero (1988)

== F ==
- Miguel Faílde, Cuba claves musician (1991)
- Juan Manuel Fangio, race car driver (2013)
- Michael Faraday, physicist (1994)
- Eduardo Farini, Uruguay drums musician (1991)
- Maria Felíx, actress (2013)
- Konstantin Feoktistov, cosmonaut (1966)
- Antonio Fernández, revolution leader (1966)
- Joseíto Fernández, singer (2008)
- Juan Fernández Ruz, general (1996)
- Ibrahim Ferrer, singer and musician (2007)
- Domingo Figarola Caneda, director of the National Library of Cuba (1957)
- Fernando Figueredo, intellectual and Cuban revolutionary fighter (1951)
- Pedro Figueredo, composer of the Cuban national anthem (1979)
- Carlos J. Finlay, discoverer of yellow fever transmission (1934)
- Alexander Fleming, Scottish biologist, pharmacologist and botanist (2013)
- José Asunción Flores, Paraguay harp musician (1991)
- Carlos Fonseca, Nicaraguan revolutionary (1986)
- Ernesto Fonts Sterling, secretary of the Exchequer (1956)
- Rafael Forún, sprinter (2014)
- Benjamin Franklin, author, postmaster, scientist, and statesman (1899)
- Sigmund Freud, psychoanalyst (1993)

== G ==
- Antonio Gades, flamenco dancer (2013)
- Yuri A. Gagarin, cosmonaut (1963)
- Maria Galarraga, unknown (1972)
- Rómulo Gallegos, Venezuelan writer (1989)
- Tomas Gamba, military official (1972)
- Mahatma Gandhi, Indian independence leader (1997)
- Greta Garbo, actress (1995)
- Calixto García, general (1910)
- Rogelio Garcia, Cuban baseball player (2004)
- Reynold Garcia Garcia, revolutionary (1981)
- Vicente Garcia y Gonzalez, president (1959)
- Victor Manuel Garcia, painter (1997)
- Ava Gardner, film star (2001)
- Henri Giffard, French engineer (1991)
- Antonio Ginard Rojas, Communications Association (1954)
- Gertrudis Gómez de Avellaneda, writer (1914)
- José Miguel Gómez, Cuban president and general (1937)
- Raul Gomez Garcia, revolutionary (1964)
- Candido Gonzalez, revolution leader (1966)
- Enrique González Mántici, composer (2010)
- Fernando González del Valle, physician (1958)
- Fernando González, Cuban imprisoned in the United States (2005)
- Jorge González Allué, composer (2014)
- René González, Cuban imprisoned in the United States (2005)
- Sergio Gonzalez, rebel leader (1964)
- Juan Gualberto Gómez, revolutionary leader (1955)
- Máximo Gómez, military commander (1910)
- Alfonso Goulet Goulet, Cuban brigadier general (1995)
- Lourdes Gourriel, Cuban baseball player (2003)
- Mariana Grajales, women's rights and independence activist (1969)
- Ulysses S. Grant, president of the United States (1899)
- John Robert Gregg, inventor of the Gregg shorthand system (1957)
- Eliseo Grenet, Cuban composer (1966)
- Angel Guerra Porro, general (1996)
- José Luis Guerra Agular, director of the Postal Museum (1991)
- Antonio Guerrero, Cuban imprisoned in the United States (2005)
- Ernesto "Che" Guevara, revolution leader (1968)
- Nicolás Guillén, poet (2002)
- Antonio Guiteras y Holmes, politician (1951)
- Juan Guiteras, Cuban physician and pathologist (1952)
- Nicolás José Gutiérrez, physician and educator (1940)
- Pedro Gutiérrez, Cuban revolutionary fighter (1998)

== H ==
- Paul Haenlein, German engineer and flight pioneer (1991)
- Otto Hahn, physical chemist (1994)
- Gerhard Armauer Hansen, doctor (1948)
- Paul P. Harris, founder of Rotary International (1955)
- Enrique Hart Ramirez, judge (2010)
- Rita Hayworth, film star (2001)
- Dayton Hedges, founder of Cuban textile industry (1958)
- Ernest Hemingway, American author (1963)
- Camilo Henríquez, Chilean priest, writer and politician (1937)
- Henry the Navigator, Portuguese explorer (1992)
- Enrique Calleja Hensell, Communications Association (1954)
- José María Heredia, poet and patriot (1940, 1957)
- Charles Hernández y Sandrino, colonel (1952)
- Gerardo Hernández, Cuban imprisoned in the United States (2005)
- Gregorio Hernández Sáez, postal worker (1954)
- Miguel Hidalgo y Costilla, leader of the Mexican War of Independence (1988)
- Rowland Hill, developer of the postage stamp (1990)
- Eugenio María de Hostos, Puerto Rican writer (1989)
- Rock Hudson, film star (2001)
- Alexander von Humboldt, German naturalist (1969)

== I ==
- Federico Incháustegui Cabrera, general (1995)
- Jorge Isaacs, Colombian novelist (1989)
- Isabella I of Spain, queen of Spain (1952)
- Isabella II of Spain, queen of Spain (1855)

== J ==
- Andrew Jackson, president of the United States (1899)
- Francisco Javier de Céspedes, president (1959)
- Hu Jintao, Chinese General Secretary (2005)
- John Paul II, pope (1998)
- Tomas Jordan, general (1995)
- José de la Luz y Caballero, educator (1917)
- Benito Juárez, Mexican lawyer and politician (2006)
- Enrique del Junco Cruz Muñoz, general (1997)
- Francisco Carrera Justiz, educator and statesman (1953)

== K ==
- Orestes Kindelán, Cuban baseball player (2002)
- Martin Luther King, American civil rights activist (1986)
- Robert Koch, discoverer of the tuberculosis bacillus (1982)
- Vladimir Komarov, cosmonaut (1966)
- Sergei P. Korolev, Soviet rocket engineer and spacecraft designer (1981)
- Arthur Constantin Krebs, French officer and pioneer in automotive engineering (2000)
- Pedro Kouri Esmeja, tropical medicine doctor and researcher (2000)

== L ==
- Ramón Labañino, Cuban imprisoned in the United States (2005)
- Angel Laborde, medical student (1952)
- Jose A. Gonzalez Lanuza, lawyer (1958)
- Carlos A. Latorre, medical student (1952)
- Emanuel Lasker, chess champion (1976)
- Francisco Borrero Lavadi, general (1995)
- Pierre Lebaudy, French industrialist and philanthropist (2000)
- Paul Lebaudy, French industrialist and politician (2000)
- Juan V. Lecuna, Venezuela musician (1991)
- Ernesto Lecuona, Cuban composer (1966)
- William Lemon, member of the British parliament (1972)
- Vladimir Lenin, Russian communist revolutionary and politician (1964)
- Leonardo da Vinci, scientist (1996)
- Aleksei A. Leonov, cosmonaut (1965)
- Pío Leyva, Cuban singer (2007)
- Omar Linares, Cuban baseball player (2002)
- Abraham Lincoln, president of the United States (1937)
- Joseph Lister, British surgeon and a pioneer of antiseptic surgery (1993)
- Franz Liszt, Hungarian composer (1997)
- Miguel Coyula Llaguno, journalist (1954)
- Pedro Gonzalez Llorente, lawyer (1958)
- Mikhail Lomonosov, scientist (1996)
- Carlos Antonio López, leader of Paraguay (1937)
- Narciso López, Venezuelan adventurer and soldier (1951)
- Federico García Lorca, poet (1998)
- Toussaint L'Ouverture, leader of the Haitian Revolution (1991)
- Dulce María Loynaz, writer (2002)
- Enrique Loynaz de Castillo, composer (1971)
- Oscar Lucero, rebel leader (1964)
- Luis de Las Casas, governor-general of Cuba (1972)
- Auguste Lumière, inventor of the motion picture (1995)
- Louis Lumière, inventor of the motion picture (1995)
- Gregorio Luperón, Dominican military and state leader (1997)

== M ==
- Clara Louise Maass, American nurse and martyr (1951)
- Antonio Maceo, revolution leader (1907)
- José Maceo, general (1952)
- Joaquim Maria Machado de Assis, Brazilian novelist (1989)
- Gerardo Machado, president of Cuba (1928)
- Nelson Mandela, president of South Africa (2014)
- Celia Sánchez Manduley, Cuban revolutionary, politician, and archivist (1990)
- Rafael Manduley del Río, patriot (1957)
- Mari Mantilla, goddaughter of José Martí (2006)
- Carlos Manuel de Céspedes, president (1917)
- Manuel de Jesús Calvar, president (1959)
- Guglielmo Marconi, Italian inventor and electrical engineer (1996)
- Miguel Matamoros, Cuban musician and composer (2007)
- Segundo L. Moreno, Ecuador xylophone musician (1991)
- Juan Manuel Márquez, revolution leader (1966)
- José Martí, Cuban national hero, writer and revolution leader (1917, 1953, 1954)
- José Francisco Martí Zayas Bazán, politician and soldier (2004)
- Mariano Marti, father of José Marti (2004)
- Karl Marx, philosopher and revolutionary socialist (1982)
- Juan Morell y Campos, Puerto Rico cuatro musician (1991)
- Bartolomé Masó, politician and military patriot (1910)
- Steve McQueen, film star (2001)
- Julio Antonio Mella, founder of the Cuban Communist Party (2004)
- Javier Mendez, Cuban baseball player (2003)
- Jesus Menendez Larrondo, Cuban trade unionist (1998)
- Arnaldo Tamayo Méndez, Cuban cosmonaut (1981)
- José M. Medina, medical student (1952)
- Rafael María de Mendive, Cuban poet (1993)
- Julio Antonio Mella, revolution leader (1968)
- Jesus Menéndez, leader in sugar industry (1961)
- Raimundo G, Menocal, physician (1956)
- Mario García Menocal, president of Cuba (1955)
- Pedro Mercado, trumpet player with Havana Philharmonic Orchestra (1974)
- Germán Mesa, Cuban baseball player (2002)
- Víctor Mesa, Cuban baseball player (2004)
- Jean Baptiste Meusnier, French mathematician andrevolutionary general (1991)
- José Jacinto Milanés, poet, linguist and writer (1956)
- Ho Chi Minh, president of North Viet Nam (1970)
- Vicente Miniet Ginarte, general of the army of liberation (1956)
- Matilde Moisant, female aviator (2011)
- Antonio Mompo, cellist with Havana Philharmonic Orchestra (1974)
- José Guillermo Moncada Veranes, general (1941)
- Marilyn Monroe, American film actress (1995)
- Rita Montaner, Cuban singer, pianist, actress (1995)
- Jose Maria Garcia Montes, lawyer (1958)
- Maria Teresa Garcia Montes, founder of the Musical Arts Society (1959)
- Juan Montalvo, Ecuadorian satirist (1937, 1989)
- Rita Montaner, Cuban singer, pianist, and actress (1999)
- Rafael Montoro Valdez, statesman (1953)
- María Teresa Mora, Cuban chess master (2004)
- Menelao Mora, guerrilla (1963)
- Berta Moraleda, Cuban female aviator (2011)
- Francisco Morazán, politician and general of Honduras (1937)
- Benny Moré, singer (1999)
- Pedro Agustín Morell de Santa Cruz, bishop (1956)
- Wolfgang Amadeus Mozart, Austrian composer (1997)
- Antonio Muñoz Hernández, Cuban baseball player (2003)
- Mario Muñoz, revolutionist (2013)
- Victor Muñoz, founder of Mother's Day in Cuba (1956)

== N ==
- Antonio Nariño, Colombian political and military leader (1988)
- Jawaharlal Nehru, prime minister of India (2010)
- Pablo Neruda, Chilean poet (1989)
- Agostinho Neto, president of Angola (2002)
- Bola de Nieve, singer-pianist and songwriter (1999)
- Andrian G. Nikolaev, cosmonaut (1963)
- Emilio Núñez Rodríguez, general and revolutionary hero (1955)
- Enrique Nuñez, writer, screenwriter, playwright and humorist (1952)

== O ==
- Bernardo O'Higgins, Chilean independence leader (1988)
- Roberto Ondino, flute player with Havana Philharmonic Orchestra (1974)
- Agustín Parlá Orduñas, aviator (1952)
- Fernando Ortiz, folklorist (1981)

== P ==
- Antonio Pacheco, Cuban baseball player (2002)
- Manuel Ascencio Padilla, Peruvian guerrilla chief (1988)
- Orlando Pantoja Tamayo, guerrilla (2012)
- Agustín Parlá Orduña, aviator (1952)
- Louis Pasteur, chemist (1993)
- Ivan Pavlov, Russian physiologist (1993)
- Pablo Picasso, painter (1981)
- Tomas Padro, general of the army of liberation (1957)
- Frank País, educator and revolution leader (1966)
- José Joaquín Palma, poet, author and revolutionary (1956)
- Ricardo Palma, Peruvian writer (1989)
- Tomás Estrada Palma, president (1917)
- Otto Parellada, revolution leader (1966)
- Antonio L. Pausa, postal clerk (1950)
- Lazaro Pena, trade unionist (1982)
- Luis Ignatius Peñalver y Cárdenas, bishop (1945)
- Vicente Mora Pera, postmaster-general (1972)
- F. Peraza, general of the army of liberation (1957)
- Rogelio Perea, Cuban revolutionary fighter (1998)
- Guido "Inti" Peredo, revolutionary (1972)
- Dámaso Pérez Prado, bandleader and musician (1999)
- Leonor Perez Cabrera, mother of José Marti (2004)
- Luisa Pérez de Zambrana, writer (1956)
- Matías Pérez, Cuban aeronautics pioneer (1965)
- August von Parseval, German airship designer (2000)
- François Philido, chess champion (1976)
- Ignacio Piñeiro, Cuban musician and composer (2007)
- Martín Alonso Pinzón, Portuguese navigator and explorer (1992)
- William Pitt, British prime minister (1971)
- Max Planck, theoretical physicist (1994)
- Felipe Poey y Aloy, natural historian (1958)
- Fidelio Ponce de León, painter (2014)
- Leonid Popov, cosmonaut (1981)
- Pavel R. Popovich, cosmonaut (1963)
- Belisario Porras, president of Panama (1989)
- Tyrone Power, film star (2001)
- Chano Pozo, jazz percussionist, singer, dancer and composer (1999)
- Carlos Puebla, Cuban singer, guitarist, and composer (2004)

== Q ==
- Gonzalo de Quesada, architect of Cuba's Independence Movement (1940)

== R ==
- José Rafael de las Heras, politician (1983)
- Santiago Ramón y Cajal, Spanish pathologist (1993)
- Henry M. Reeve, cavalry commander (1976)
- Álvaro Reinoso, sugar scientist (1954)
- Charles Renard, French military engineer (2000)
- Alfonso Reyes, Mexican poet (1989)
- Raúl Roa García, Cuban intellectual, politician and diplomat (2004)
- Eliseo Reyes Rodríguez, guerrilla and revolutionary (2000)
- José Ignacio Rivero y Alonso, editor of Diario de la Marina (1958)
- Yuri Roanenko, cosmonaut (1981)
- Alejandro Robaina Pereda, Cuban tobacco grower (2012)
- José Enrique Rodó, Uruguayan essayist (1937)
- Arsenio Rodríguez, Cuban musician, composer and bandleader (2007)
- Alberto Rodríguez Acosta, general (1997)
- Emilio Núñez Rodríguez, general and revolutionary hero (1955)
- José María Rodríquez y Rodríquez (Mayía), Cuban military man (1910, 1954)
- Pascal Rodríquez, medical student (1952)
- Emilio Roig de Leuchsenring, historian (1984)
- Gonzalo Roig, composer (2010)
- Francisco Dominguez Roldán, introduced radiotherapy and physiotherapy (1958)
- Amadeo Roldán, Cuban composer (1966)
- Carlos Roloff, general and liberation activist (1910, 1944)
- Tomas Romay, physician and scientist (1964)
- Yuri Romanenko, cosmonaut (2005)
- Luis Estevez Romero, vice-president of Cuba (1952)
- Antonio María Romeu, composer (1977)
- Wilhelm Conrad Röntgen, German physicist (1993)
- Franklin Delano Roosevelt, president of the United States (1947)
- Theodore Roosevelt, president of the United States (1958)
- Avelino Rosas, general of the army of liberation (1957)
- Ethel Rosenburg, American communist (1978)
- Julius Rosenburg, American communist (1978)
- Domingo Rosillo del Toro, Cuban pilot (2013)
- Pierre Paul Émile Roux, French physician, bacteriologist and immunologist (1993)
- Ruth Rowland, female aviator (2011)
- Isabel Rubio Diaz, medical aide (1998)
- Vaeleri Ryumin, cosmonaut (1981)
- Jeannette Ryder, founder of the Humane Society of Cuba (1957)

== S ==
- José Antonio Saco, statesman, writer and historian (1917, 1954)
- Alfredo de Saint-Malo, Panama mejorana musician (1991)
- Luis Saiz, revolutionary (2006)
- Sergio Saiz, revolutionary (2006)
- Marcelo Salado, rebel leader (1964)
- Brindis de Salas, musician (1958)
- Salvador del Muro, governor of Cuba (1972)
- José de San Martín, Argentine general and independence leader (1988)
- Antonio Sánchez de Bustamante, Cuban lawyer (1955)
- Celia Sánchez, party leader (1985)
- Eduardo Sánchez de Fuentes, Cuban composer (1966)
- Jose J. Sanchez, general of the army of liberation (1957)
- Mariano Sánchez Vaillant, general (1997)
- Serafín Sánchez, general (1956)
- Victoria Brú Sánchez, nurse (1957)
- Augusto César Sandino, Nicaraguan revolutionary (1984)
- Julio Sanguily, general (1956)
- Manuel Sanguily Garritte, cabinet member and author (1949)
- Pedro Sanjuan, Havana Philharmonic Orchestra (1974)
- Pedro Santacilia, writer, journalist and poet (2006)
- Abel Santamaría, revolutionary leader (1962)
- Haydée Santamaría, guerrilla and political Cuban (2009)
- Francisco de Paula Santander, Colombian military and political leader (1937)
- Domingo Sarmiento, Argentine educator (1989)
- Antonio Oms Sarret, communications (1947)
- David Schwarz, Hungarian-Croatian aviation pioneer (1991)
- Ruy Lopez Segura, chess champion (1976)
- César Pérez Sentenat, pianist with Havana Philharmonic Orchestra (1974)
- Vittorio De Sica, Italian director and actor (1995)
- Moisés Simons, Cuban composer (1966)
- Enrique Soro, Chile drum musician (1991)
- Juan Bautista Spotorno, president (1959)
- Juan Francisco Steegers y Perera, fingerprint identification pioneer (1957)
- Wilhelm Steinitz, chess champion (1976)
- Manuel Márquez Sterling, Cuban diplomat and president of Cuba (1946)
- Antonio José de Sucre, Venezuelan independence leader (1988)
- Sukarno, president of Indonesia (2008)
- Kim Il Sung, president of North Korea (1998)

== T ==
- Arnaldo Tamayo, cosmonaut (2005)
- Esteban Tamayo Tamayo, general (1996)
- Jose Luis Tasende, revolutionary (1983)
- Peter Ilyich Tchaikovsky, composer (1993)
- Adolfo Teodore, aviation pioneer (1970)
- Valentina V. Tereshkova, cosmonaut (1963)
- Jose Tey, revolution leader (1966)
- Tiradentes, hero of Brazilian Independence (1988)
- Gherman S. Titov, cosmonaut (1963)
- Eladio G. Toledo, medical student (1952)
- Emilia Teurbe Tolón, patriot (1951)
- Miguel Teurbe Tolón, writer and teacher (1951)
- Albert Tissandier, French architect, aviator, editor and archaeologist (2000)
- Gaston Tissandier, French adventurer (2000)
- Bernarda Tora Pelegrin, aided Cuban revolution (1998)
- Carlos de la Torre y Huerta, naturalist (1958)
- Vincenta de la Torre, dancer (2014)
- Pablo de la Torriente Brau, writer (2001)
- Bobbi Trout, female aviator (2011)
- Konstantin Eduardovich Tsiolkovsky, Soviet rocket and space sciences pioneer (1966)

== U ==
- Luis Ulacia, Cuban baseball player (2002)
- Pedro Urena, Dominican writer (1989)
- Guillermo Uribe-Holguin, Colombia drum musician (1991)

== V ==
- Fermín Valdés Domínguez, physician and Cuban patriot (2004)
- Jorge L. Valdes, Cuban baseball player (2003)
- Miguelito Valdés, Cuban singer (1999)
- Fermin Valdez Domínguez, defense lawyer (1952)
- Lázaro Valle, Cuban baseball player (2003)
- Félix Varela, Roman Catholic priest and independence leader (1955)
- Lázaro Vargas, Cuban baseball player (2003)
- Pedro Vargas Sotomayor, general (1996)
- A. Varona, general of the army of liberation (1957)
- Enrique José Varona, author (1950)
- Carlos Verdugo, medical student (1952)
- Jules Verne, writer (1981)
- Amerigo Vespucci, Italian explorer (1992)
- Heitor Villa-Lobos, Brazil resonator trumpet musician (1991)
- Cirilo Villaverde, writer (2012)
- Rubén Martínez Villena, revolutionary (1974)
- Braudilio Vinent, Cuban baseball player (2004)
- André Voisin, French naturalist (1965)

== W ==
- George Washington, president of the United States (1899)
- James Watt, Scottish inventor and mechanical engineer (1996)
- Daniel Webster, American senator and statesman (1899)
- José White, musician (1958)
- Friedrich Hermann Wölfert, German publisher and aviation pioneer (1991)
- Natalie Wood, film star (2001)
- Orville Wright, aviation pioneer (2003)
- Wilbur Wright, aviation pioneer (2003)

== Y ==
- Boris Yegorov, cosmonaut (1966)
- Igor Youskévitch, ballet dancer (2006)

== Z ==
- L. L. Zamenhof, creator of Esperanto (1987)
- Juan Bruno Zayas, military doctor (1910, 1933)
- Juan Clemente Zenea, writer (1956)
- Ferdinand Graf von Zeppelin, German general and aircraft manufacturer (1991)
- Clara Zetkin, advocate for women's rights (1965)

== Sources ==
- Edifil; Catálogo Especializado de Sellos de Cuba, Tomo I (1855–1958), 2nd Ed.; Madrid, 2002 (in Spanish).
- Jones, Wm. P. and Roy, Rudy J.; A Handbook of the Stamps of Cuba in 3 volumes. 3rd Ed. 2011. (complete through 1958)
- Scott Standard Postage Stamp Catalogue, Volume 2, 2015
- Stanley Gibbons Stamp Catalogue, Part 15, 3rd Edition, 2007
