= Andrés Manuel Sánchez =

Cuban revolutionary (1805-1826)

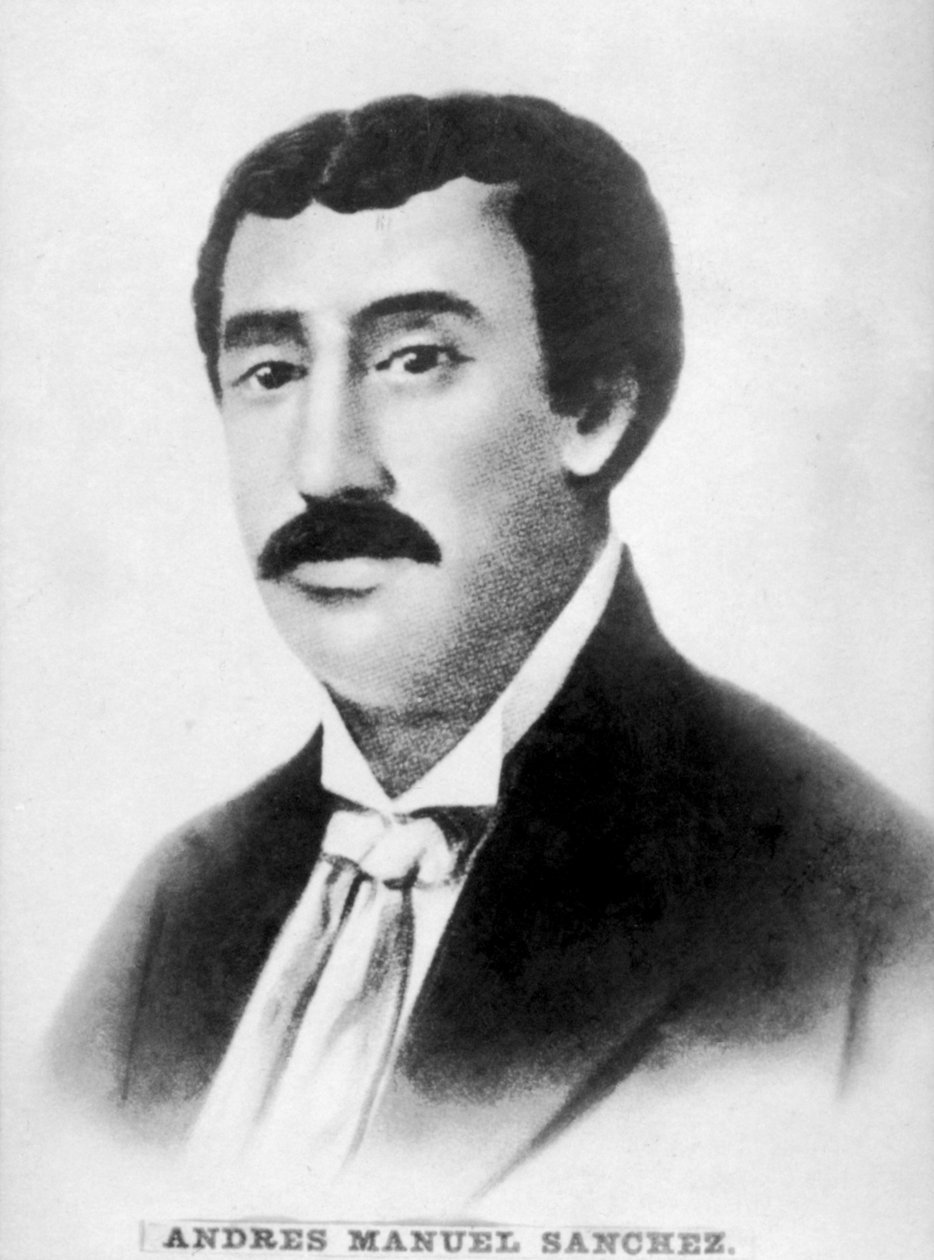
- Born: Andrés Manuel Leocadio Sánchez y Pérez; December 9, 1805; Puerto Príncipe, Captaincy General of Cuba, Spanish Empire
- Died: March 16, 1826 (aged 20); Puerto Príncipe, Captaincy General of Cuba, Spanish Empire

Andrés Manuel Sánchez (December 9, 1805 - March 16, 1826) was a Cuban revolutionary who was among the first martyrs of Cuba's struggle for independence.

== Biography ==
Andrés Manuel Leocadio Sánchez y Pérez was born in Puerto Príncipe (now Camagüey), Spanish Cuba on December 9, 1805. The term "pardo" was used to describe him.

Sánchez was involved in the Soles y Rayos de Bolívar conspiracy led by José Francisco Lemus which sought to establish the island as an independent republic with the help of Bolívar. The suppression of the separatist plot in the summer of 1823 led to arrest warrants for the conspirators. Sánchez and Francisco Agüero Velasco managed to flee, first to Jamaica in 1824, then to the United States, where they eventually settled in Philadelphia and connected with Gaspar Betancourt Cisneros.

To seek the aid of Simón Bolívar, Sánchez went with Francisco Agüero Velasco to Cartagena, Colombia in 1825. They enlisted in the Colombian Army and were assigned the rank of second lieutenant.

After relocating to Jamaica, the closest place to reach Cuba, a new plan was developed to gain entry to the island. In March 1826, Agüero alongside Andrés Manuel Sánchez led the first significant revolt for Cuban independence at Puerto Príncipe in Camagüey Province. The uprising reached its end as they were apprehended by the forces of Captain-General Francisco Dionisio Vives, who detained them along with eight other insurgents. Refusing to divulge information about their leaders, the men were sentenced to death for treason.

== Death ==
Andrés Manuel Sánchez was executed by hanging on March 16, 1826, at the main square of Puerto Príncipe (now Camagüey). As a result of their execution, Sánchez and Agüero were the first martyrs in Cuba's fight for independence.
