= Francisco Agüero Velasco =

Cuban revolutionary (1793–1826)

Francisco de Agüero
- Born: Francisco de Agüero y Velasco; 1793; Puerto Príncipe, Captaincy General of Cuba, Spanish Empire
- Died: March 16, 1826 (aged 32–33); Puerto Príncipe, Captaincy General of Cuba, Spanish Empire
- Other name: Frasquito

Francisco de Agüero was a Cuban revolutionary who was one of the first martyrs of Cuba's struggle for independence.

== Biography ==
Francisco de Agüero y Velasco, also known as Frasquito, was born in Puerto Príncipe (now Camagüey), Spanish Cuba, in 1793. He was the son of Josefa Velasco Agüero and Pablo Antonio Betancourt Agüero.

In 1822, Agüero belonged to the Triangular Chain of Camagüey (Spanish: Cadena Triangular de Camagüey), a masonic lodge linked to the 1823 José Francisco Lemus conspiracy. The Soles y Rayos de Bolívar conspiracy led by Lemus sought to abolish slavery and establish an independent republic. In the summer of 1823, the separatist plot was suppressed and the conspirators were ordered to be arrested. Agüero managed to escape abroad, first to Jamaica in 1824, then to the United States, eventually settling in Philadelphia where he associated with Gaspar Betancourt Cisneros. While in North America, he immersed himself in progressive literature, including The Rights of Man and The Age of Reason by Thomas Paine and Rousseau's The Social Contract.

The following year, Agüero and Andrés Manuel Sánchez went to Cartagena, Colombia to request the support of Simón Bolívar. They joined the Colombian Army and obtained the military rank of second lieutenant. They eventually relocated to Jamaica, the closest place to access Cuba. While in Jamaica, a new liberation plan was forged to infiltrate the island.

From Kingston, Jamaica, they left on the schooner Maryland in January 1826 and arrived near Santa Cruz del Sur. Spanish intelligence first detected them on the Caribbean island and informed Francisco Illas, the governor of Santiago de Cuba, who then passed the information to the governor of Puerto Príncipe. In March 1826, Puerto Príncipe (in Camagüey Province) was the site of the first armed insurrection for independence, orchestrated by Agüero and Andrés Manuel Sánchez. Agüero, Sánchez, and eight other compatriots were captured after launching the insurrection on the southern coast of Camagüey province. They were apprehended by the aides of Captain-General Francisco Dionisio Vives and condemned to die for treason when they refused to divulge the secrets of their leaders.

== Death ==
On March 16, 1826, Francisco Agüero Velasco was hanged at Plaza Mayor, the central square of Puerto Príncipe. By being executed, Agüero and Sánchez were the first martyrs of Cuba's struggle for independence.
