= Tomás Pío Betancourt =

Cuban statesmen (1800–1863)

Personal details
- Born: Tomás Pío Betancourt y Sánchez-Pereira; 1800 Puerto Príncipe, Captaincy General of Cuba, Spanish Empire
- Died: August 4, 1863 (aged 62–63)

Tomás Pío Betancourt (1800 - August 4, 1863) was a Cuban landowner, lawyer, botanist, and the first historian of the town of Camagüey (formerly Puerto Príncipe) in Cuba.

== Biography ==
Tomás Pío Betancourt y Sánchez-Pereira was born in Puerto Príncipe (now Camagüey), Spanish Cuba around the early 1800s. His family was one of the wealthiest and most distinguished in the region. His lineage traces back to the surname Bettencourt.

On December 25, 1827, he married Maria Loreto Agramonte in the Camagüey Cathedral.

He was a member of the Patriotic Deputation of Camagüey and in 1835, he was a deputy of the Royal Development Board.

He, along with Gaspar Betancourt Cisneros and another landowner, successfully obtained a concession from Miguel Tacón in January 1837 to build a railway from Camagüey to Nuevitas.

He was the first Camagüey native to venture into the field of botany in the town. He was a pupil of Mariano Lagasca in Madrid. A series of his works on botany were published starting in 1839.

Tomás Pío Betancourt became the first historian of the town of Camagüey (formerly Puerto Príncipe) in Cuba. Historia de Puerto Príncipe, a foundational work in Camagüey's historiography was written by Tomás Pío Betancourt Sánchez-Pereira and published in 1840.

His daughter, Dolores Betancourt, was born in 1856 to him and Mercedes Agramonte who he married in 1852.

In the early 1860s, he was a lawyer in the Real Audiencia of Puerto Príncipe, the highest appellate court in Spanish colonies.

== Death ==
Tomás Pío Betancourt died on August 4, 1863.

Following his death, Tomás Betancourt had a district in Camagüey named after him.
