= Gaspar Betancourt Cisneros =

Cuban writer, journalist (1803-1866)

Gaspar Betancourt y Cisneros
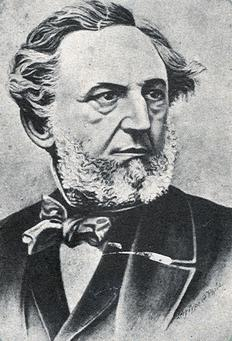

Personal details
- Born: Gaspar Betancourt y Cisneros; April 28, 1803 Puerto Príncipe, Captaincy General of Cuba, Spanish Empire
- Died: December 7, 1866 (aged 63) Havana, Captaincy General of Cuba, Spanish Empire
- Nickname: El Lugareño

Gaspar Betancourt y Cisneros (April 28, 1803 - December 7, 1866), also known as "El Lugareño" (English: The Local), was a Cuban revolutionary, writer, and pioneer of Cuban journalism.

== Early life and education ==
Gaspar Betancourt y Cisneros was born in Puerto Príncipe (now Camagüey), Spanish Cuba on April 28, 1803. He was baptized in the Camagüey Cathedral.

He was born into a noble and affluent planter family in Camagüey. He was an elder relative of Salvador Cisneros Betancourt. His family heritage links back to the Bettencourt surname and Jean de Béthencourt, the figure who initiated the Canary Islands' colonization in 1402.

Betancourt was an early student of Félix Varela. He studied in his hometown of Camagüey until the early 1820s.

== Career ==
In 1822, he was sent to the United States to complete his studies in Philadelphia and gained employment at a trading house.

In 1823, a young Betancourt participated in a delegation of a Cuban independentist group tied to Antonio Valero de Bernabé. The group traveled from New York to La Guaira, Venezuela to seek assistance from Simón Bolívar in overthrowing the Spanish colonial government. Bolívar, however, believed that the timing was not appropriate for their plans. He was also invited to travel along with the delegation to Gran Colombia. Back in New York, he developed associations with influential South American and Cuban figures based in New York, among them José Antonio Saco. Betancourt focused his efforts on journalism and contributed to the Weekly Messenger (Spanish: El Mensajero Semanal), a Spanish-language newspaper published by Félix Varela.

In 1834, upon his return to Cuba, he undertook extensive work to improve the country's economy and social infrastructure, such as establishing schools and constructing Cuba's first railway line. Betancourt presided over a horse-drawn railway service called Ferrocarril de Camagüey a Nuevitas that was established in 1836. In 1837, along with Tomás Pío Betancourt and another landowner, he successfully obtained the right from Miguel Tacón to build a railway from the city of Camagüey to the port of Nuevitas.

He became a well-known writer associated with the costumbrismo movement. Under the alias El Lugareño, he wrote for El Fanal de Camagüey in 1837, publishing insightful articles on science, literature, and critiques of industry, colonization, and agriculture.

In the 1840s, he was actively involved in the campaign to annex Cuba to the United States, joining the annexationist cause. His suspected involvement in revolutionary activities against the colonial government led to his exile in 1846. Under orders from Captain General Leopoldo O'Donnell, he was forced to emigrate to the United States. The exiled Cuban joined Club de la Habana, a network of annexationists in the United States in 1847.

== Cuban Junta ==
He organized the first Cuban Revolutionary Junta of New York in 1848, aimed at bolstering Cuba’s political interests and opposing Spanish governance. During this time, he was also an editor of the annexationist propaganda paper La Verdad. Gaspar Betancourt, accompanied by other supporters of annexation, met with U.S. President James K. Polk on June 23, 1848, to request U.S. military assistance for a Cuban revolt against Spanish control. Polk declined to provide support for the insurgency and instead proposed that the United States offer Spain $100 million for Cuba, a proposal that was turned down by Spain.

=== López Expedition ===
By December 1849, the Spanish authorities were determined to suppress all movements of anti-government activities in the United States. For his role in the second López Expedition, Betancourt Cisneros received a ten-year transmarino imprisonment and a lifelong prohibition on returning to Cuba on August 19, 1850. Alongside others, he was ordered to pay the costs of the damages sustained during the López invasion of Cárdenas.

The formal inauguration of the Cuban Junta Association took place on October 19, 1952. The inaugural meeting appointed Gaspar Betancourt Cisneros as president, Manuel De J. Arango as vice president, Porfirio Valiente as Secretary, Jose Elias Hernandez as Vice Secretary, and Domingo de Goicouria as Treasurer. On September 1, 1854, serving as President of the Junta, Betancourt Cisneros delivered a speech at the Mechanics' Institute in New Orleans to honor the third anniversary of Narciso López's death and the martyrs for Cuban liberty. The first Cuban Junta lasted until 1855 and Betancourt remained a supporter of Cuba's independence, albeit with reduced involvement.

Betancourt visited Europe in 1856, finding residence first in Florence, Italy. He married Doña María Monserrate Canalejo e Hidalgo-Gato in Havana on September 7, 1857. Their union bore fruit in the birth of their son, Alfonso Betancourt y Canalejo, born in Florence, in February 1859. Following a period in Paris, he went back to Cuba in 1861 and resumed his work in journalism.

== Death ==
Gaspar Betancourt Cisneros died in Havana, Cuba on December 7, 1866.
