= Wright C. Schaumburg =

Confederate Army officer (1843-1896)

- Born: July 7, 1842; St. Louis, Missouri
- Died: July 9, 1896 (aged 54); New Orleans, Louisiana
- Burial place: Metairie Cemetery
- Military career
- Allegiance: Confederate States of America
- Branch: Missouri State Guard; Confederate States Army
- Service years: 1861–1865
- Rank: Lieutenant-Colonel
- Units: Fifth Division (MSG); First Missouri Confederate Brigade
- Conflicts: American Civil War; Battle of Pea Ridge; Red River campaign; Ten Years' War

Wright C. Schaumburg (July 7, 1842 – July 9, 1896) was an American military officer who served in the Confederate States Army during the American Civil War.

== Early life ==
Wright C. Schaumburg was born in St. Louis, Missouri on July 7, 1842.

He was born to Charles and Orleana C. Schaumburg. His father was a district judge in New Orleans. His grandfather was Colonel Bartholomew Schaumburg, a distinguished United States Army officer.

In 1856, he was admitted to the St. Louis High School. He enrolled in the University of Virginia in 1860.

== American Civil War ==
At the outbreak of the American Civil War, the university student took part in the impending struggle against St. Louis Unionists and aligned himself with the Confederate cause. When the Southern Guard, a volunteer force composed of 100 University of Virginia students formed in January 1861, he joined. Schaumburg left with the Southern Guard on April 17, 1861.

=== Camp Jackson Affair ===
Once the Southern Guard disbanded at the start of May, Schaumburg became involved in a unit of the pro-secession Missouri Volunteer Militia (MVM) set up by Missouri Governor Claiborne Fox Jackson. Mobilized by Jackson to seize the U.S. Arsenal in St. Louis, the militia's plot was thwarted by Union General Nathaniel Lyon in the Camp Jackson affair. Schaumburg was captured on May 10, 1861, with the entire brigade at Camp Jackson. Days of rioting ensued after the men were marched back into the city, and he, along with other militiamen, escaped the Federal military, rejoining the pro-Confederate forces.

=== Missouri State Guard ===
In the months that followed, he volunteered his services to the newly created Missouri State Guard (MSG) under the leadership of Governor Jackson's appointee, General Sterling Price. Schaumburg was an Aide-de-Camp in the State Guard's Fifth Division.

=== Confederate States Army ===
Along with other Missouri State Guard officers, he transferred to enter the service of the Confederate States Army in late 1861. The volunteer troops raised from Missouri were divided into brigades and battalions. Wright Schaumburg was appointed to the First Missouri Confederate Brigade commanded by Colonel Henry Little. By order of Major General Price, Schaumburg was designated as Little's Adjutant with the rank of Captain on December 12, 1861. He was also the Quartermaster and Commissary of the brigade.

=== Battle of Pea Ridge ===
Captain Wright C. Schaumburg was involved in the Battle of Pea Ridge with the Confederate Army of the West on March 7 and 8, 1862 at Elkhorn Tavern. Amid the defeat of the Confederate forces, his brigade was tasked with covering the rear on their retreat from Springfield, Missouri. Despite the loss, he was thanked by Henry Little for delivering his orders to various parts of the field under heavy fire, acting as his Assistant Adjutant-General.

Schaumburg was appointed to the Adjutant and Inspector-General's Department of the Confederate States Army on June 24, 1862.

By February 1863, he held the position of Adjutant General for General Earl Van Dorn who was placed in command of forces in the Department of Mississippi and East Louisiana. When Van Dorn died in May 1863, General Joseph E. Johnston was assigned to the Department of the West with Schaumburg serving in his staff.

By October 1863, he served on General Edmund Kirby Smith's staff until the war's conclusion. He performed the duties of Inspector General for the Trans-Mississippi theater commanded by General Smith. By 1864, he had been promoted to the ranks of Major and then Lieutenant Colonel. The surrender of General Robert E. Lee's forces in the Eastern Confederacy was followed by General Smith's negotiation of his department's surrender in May 1865, marking the end of the Confederate Trans-Mississippi Department.

== Postbellum career ==
During the Reconstruction Period, he returned to St. Louis and later engaged in business activities in New Orleans for many years. Schaumburg was distinguished in social, political, and financial circles, and he was a member of The Boston Club and The Pickwick Club.

=== Goicouria-Cristo Expedition ===
In 1869, he joined a filibustering expedition led by Cuban General Domingo de Goicouria and his second in command Colonel Louis Eduardo Cristo. Schaumburg accepted the position of Chief of Staff for the expedition, which ultimately failed when the steamship Lilian landed in Cuba from New Orleans.

=== City Council ===
In the 1870s, he resided as a citizen of St. Louis and involved himself in the city's government. From 1876 to 1877, he worked as a clerk in the Auditor's office under St. Louis Mayor Henry Overstolz.

He later took up a position with the government of the City of New Orleans. During the first administration of Mayor of New Orleans Joseph A. Shakspeare in 1882, Schaumberg was on the Board of Police Commissioners.

In 1888, he was appointed secretary in the second administration of Joseph Shakspeare. He held the position until the end of the term in 1892.

=== United Confederate Veterans ===
He joined the United Confederate Veterans, an organization created in 1889. During the 1892 annual meeting of the United Confederate Veterans in New Orleans, he was noted as a high-ranking officer.

== Death ==
Wright C. Schaumburg died on July 9, 1896, in New Orleans, Louisiana.
