= Revolution of the Suns and Rays =

Cuban historical event

- Part of Spanish American wars of independence
Date	1820–1823
Location	Spanish Cuba
Result	Rebellion suppressed; 602 arrested; 71 fined between 100 and 3,000 pesos; 29 deported to prisons in Spain; Intensified censorship, police oversight expanded, university curricula purged, liberal faculty fled or expelled

Belligerents
Suns and Rays of Bolívar Army of Bolívar	Captaincy General of Cuba	Liberal Triennium

Commanders and leaders
José Francisco Lemus José Manuel Arce	Francisco Dionisio Vives	

The Revolution of the Suns and Rays (Spanish: Conspiración de los Soles y Rayos de Bolívar) was an attempt by the Suns and Rays of Bolívar to overthrow colonial rule in the Caribbean and the Antilles, seeking to establish a new government which would be called the Republic of Cubanacán. The Suns and Rays of Bolívar were South American military forces aligned with Simón Bolívar, primarily from Venezuela, where they had been fighting to overthrow Spanish rule on the continent. "Suns and Rays" was the name of their Masonic lodge, where they hatched the plans to organize this revolution. Other Masonic movements involved in this Revolution affiliated with Freemasonry in Cuba were; Knights Rationales, Cadena Eléctrica and Cadena Triangular de Bolívar.
