= Domingo de Goicouria =

Cuban army general (1804-1870)

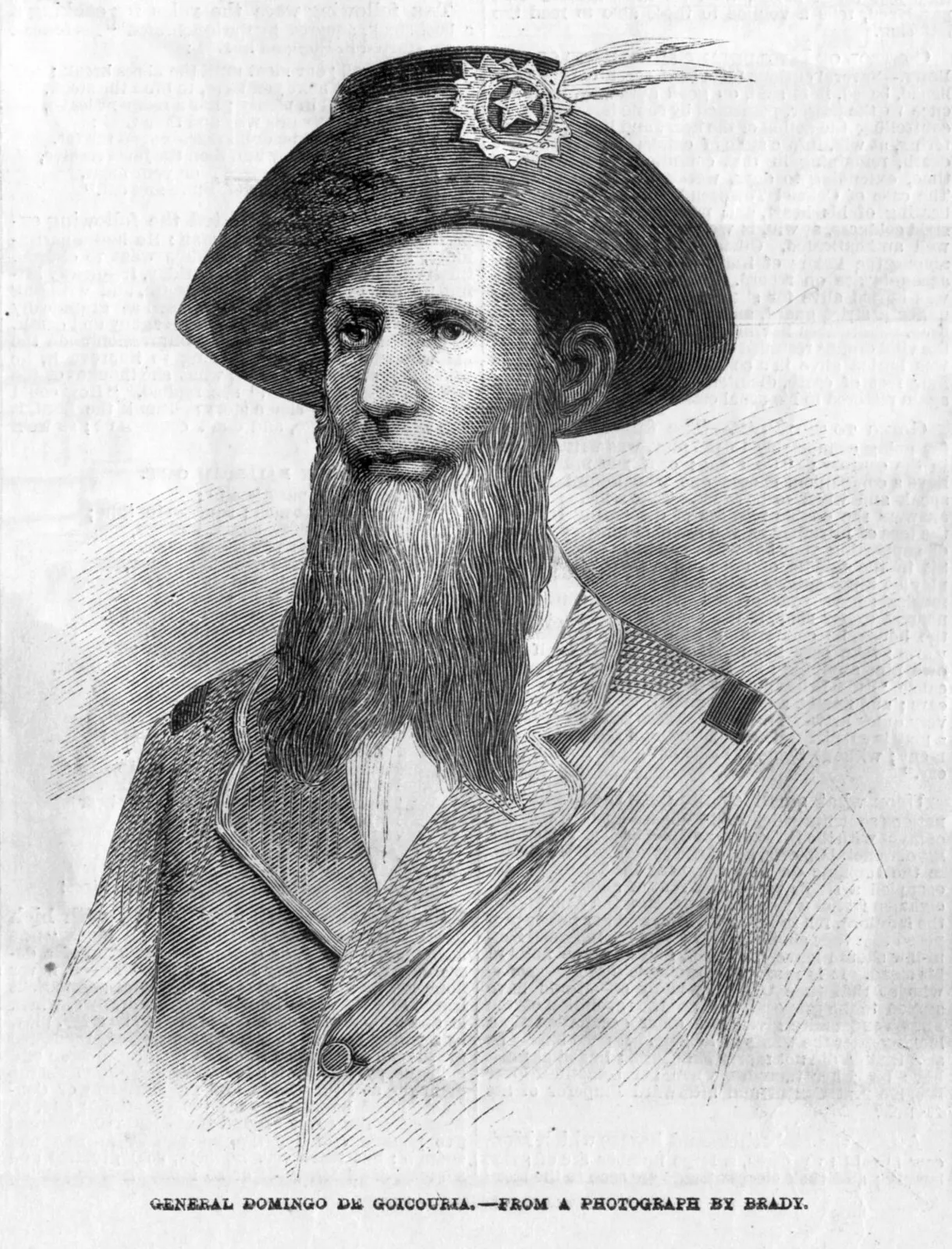
- Born: Domingo de Goicouria y Cabrera; 1804; Havana, Captaincy General of Cuba, Spanish Empire
- Died: May 7, 1870 (aged 65–66); Havana, Captaincy General of Cuba, Spanish Empire
- Military career
- Allegiance: Cuba
- Branch: Cuban Liberation Army
- Rank: General
- Conflicts: Ten Years' War

Domingo de Goicouria (1804 - May 7, 1870) was a Cuban revolutionary and army general who was executed during the Ten Years' War.

== Early life ==
Domingo de Goicouria y Cabrera was born to Spanish immigrants of the Basque region in Havana, Spanish Cuba in 1804.

He attended top schools in Havana and in the Spanish cities of Bilbao and La Coruña, receiving a privileged education throughout the 1820s.

His father was Valentin de Goicouria, a wealthy merchant and landowner. Acting as an agent for his father's Havana-based firm, Goicouria & Son, he resided in Birmingham from 1835 to 1837.

Finding his own success in commerce, he dedicated much of his fortune to the cause of freeing Cuba from Spanish rule.

== The First Cuban Junta ==
Domingo De Goicouria was among the key members of the first Cuban Junta which was founded in New York City in 1848.

=== López Expedition ===
Goicouria funded the 1850 López Expedition to liberate Cuba as the second command of Venezuelan filibuster Narciso López. He happened to be in Havana when it failed and was captured and sentenced to be executed once the Spanish learned of his role. However, his sentence was commuted to expatriation to Spain, where he resided in Seville under the watch of Spanish authorities. He escaped on an English steamer in 1852, traveling through England before reaching New York. Goicouria's experiences fueled his transformation into a fervent revolutionary. His large estates were seized, but he had wisely relocated a substantial amount of money to the U.S. for future plans.

While exiled in New York, he married Carlota Mora, the sister of Antonio Máximo Mora and José María Mora.

During the formal inauguration of the Cuban Junta association on October 19, 1952, Goicouria was officially appointed as the treasurer. The junta made efforts to annex Cuba to the United States. Goicouria's early efforts were marked by this annexationist stance before he gradually became a committed advocate for independence, ready to endanger his life on the front lines.

=== Quitman Expedition ===
In 1853, Goicouria was appointed treasurer in the arrangement of a larger expedition to invade Cuba led by American General John Quitman, the former Governor of Mississippi. Following dissensions among the leaders and under diplomatic pressure, it was later abandoned by Quitman in May 1854. After residing in Mississippi for a brief period, Goicouria returned to life in New York amid the first Cuban junta dissolving in 1855.

== Walker Affair ==
The López Expedition spurred additional filibustering attempts, including the 1855 Walker affair. On January 11, 1856, one of Goicouria's agents F.A. Laine concluded a treaty with William Walker promising to aid in seizing control of Nicaragua, with Walker agreeing to support the liberation of Cuba from Spanish rule in exchange. Funding for Goicouria's expedition to the country was provided by American shipping magnate Cornelius Vanderbilt of the Accessory Transit Company. In March 1856, Goicouria arrived in Granada from New Orleans with 250 men, and was dispatched to suppress an uprising in the Chontales region. On May 20, 1856, U.S. President Franklin Pierce officially recognized Walker's regime as the legitimate government of Nicaragua. Goicouria viewed Nicaragua as a strategic location for a future invasion of Cuba, believing that aiding Walker in establishing control there provided a better staging ground than the United States.

Walker, as the President of Nicaragua, commissioned Goicouria as a brigadier-general in the Nicaraguan Army and appointed him as Minister to England and the Court of St James's. He was to proceed to England as the diplomatic representative of Nicaragua and open negotiations to secure the port of San Juan del Norte for the country. Goicouria's departure for England was delayed in New Orleans where he arrived in July to negotiate the sale of Nicaraguan bonds. With no prospects, he delegated the work and proceeded to New York to mediate a conflict between Vanderbilt and Walker, only to have his mediation efforts dismissed by Walker. When informed of Gen. Walker's September 12 decree to re-establish slavery in Nicaragua, Goicouria chose to abandon his mission, convinced that England would not provide aid in favor of slavery. Gocoiuria severed connections with Walker on October 25, 1856. After being denounced as Walker's ambassador, he disclosed private letters to New York newspapers that exposed Walker's plans to conquer Central America, restore slavery, and form a Southern military federation. When Edmund Randolph accused him of dishonesty, treachery, and interfering in the transit business, Goicouria responded with a challenge to a duel. Randolph, who had been ill, was not in any shape to participate in a duel. In the following year, Walker surrendered to the United States Navy, while Goicouria returned to the United States and focused on commercial pursuits. Goicouria relocated from New York to Louisiana. Refusing to engage in the American Civil War, he worked extensively in trade and sea transportation, generating considerable wealth in New Orleans.

== Mexican Economic Mission ==
Seeking the necessary backing for his goals of Cuban independence, Goicouría consulted with Mexican President Benito Juárez during his exile in New Orleans.

Goicouria, in 1860, owned the Indianola, an American steamer that facilitated trade and sea transport between New Orleans and Vera Cruz and was later chartered by the Juárez government. On March 6, 1860, the ship chartered by the Liberal authorities, along with the U.S. Naval Forces' Saratoga was involved in the capture of the Mexican revolutionary leader Miguel Miramón's squadron near Vera Cruz. Gourcouria sustained a hand injury during the engagement and narrowly avoided being impaled by a large splinter.

As a result of the economic collapse from the Reform War, the Mexican president declared a two-year foreign debt moratorium to France, the U.K., and Spain after a recompensation date was missed in 1861. The matter was subsequently addressed by the Convention of London and the Second French intervention in Mexico. In 1862, Juárez appointed Goicouria as Mexico's commissioner to Washington, D.C. Acting on behalf of the Mexican economic mission in the United States, he met with Abraham Lincoln's interior minister, Caleb B. Smith to confer on the transfer of runaway slaves to the city of Veracruz. In February, Goicouria also advised Montgomery Blair on the sale of Cozumel Island for the Lincoln administration. The land was suggested as a Latin American establishment for freed slaves following an emancipation decree and to have the proceeds serve as a loan repayment from the Mexican government.

The impact of the Civil War on his business ventures compelled Goicouria to return to New York City. On June 12, 1865, Domingo de Goicouria became a naturalized citizen of the United States, residing in Manhattan.

== Paraguayan War ==
Gourcouria, in New York, was appointed as a delegate under Quintino Bocaiuva, an authorized agent of Emigration for the Brazilian Government. He worked as a deputy colonization agent for Brazil's Emigration Agency, chartering steamers for the transportation of thousands of emigrants to Brazil. He chartered the Catherine Whiting for a voyage from the port of New Orleans in June 1867 to the shores of Rio de Janeiro. In the same year, Domingo de Goicouria paid $42,000 on behalf of Brazilian authorities to charter the steamship Circassian for the transportation of emigrants from the U.S. to Brazil. He was later investigated by The United States Congress for chartering vessels. During this time it was reported that he helped the Brazilian authorities to organize victory over Paraguay during the Paraguayan War.

== Ten Years' War ==
At the onset of the War of 68', he left for the United States. Domingo de Goicouria was entrusted by the second revolutionary Cuban junta with organizing expeditions to the island of Cuba.

=== Catharine Whiting Expedition ===
In New York, Gen. Goicouria along with Col. William A.C. Ryan and other officers prepared for an expedition. On June 28, 1869, Goicouria was apprehended by Deputy Marshal Albert H. Winslow and U.S. Marshal Francis C. Barlow aboard the steamer Catharine Whiting, approximately a mile southeast of Governors Island. While W.A.C Ryan escaped, Goicouria was detained at Ludlow Street Jail. He was tried by the U.S. District Court in July 1869, for attempting to violate the Neutrality Act of 1818 in preparing an expedition for Cuba. Goicouria was released on $8,000 bail at the close of the examination. After the failed Catharine Whiting attempt, the Cuban Junta employed him to fit out another expedition.

=== Goicouria-Christo Expedition ===
Goicouria enlisted Col. Luís Eduardo del Cristo for the next filibustering expedition. On September 27, 1869, Cristo and 400 men set sail from New York on the steamer Alabama. Upon reaching the Florida coast on October 1, they were met by the Lillian and Teaser, carrying 1600 men under the Commander-in-Chief Goicouria as well as a large cache of arms and ammunition. Col. Wright C. Schaumburg and Henry McIver also participated in the expedition.

When Gen. Thomas Jordan vacated his position in February 1870, Céspedes offered Goicouria the role of General-in-chief of the Cuban Liberation Army, which he turned down.

During another attempt on March 12, 1870, he reportedly escaped from Camagüey and headed towards Las Tunas.

=== Final Expedition ===
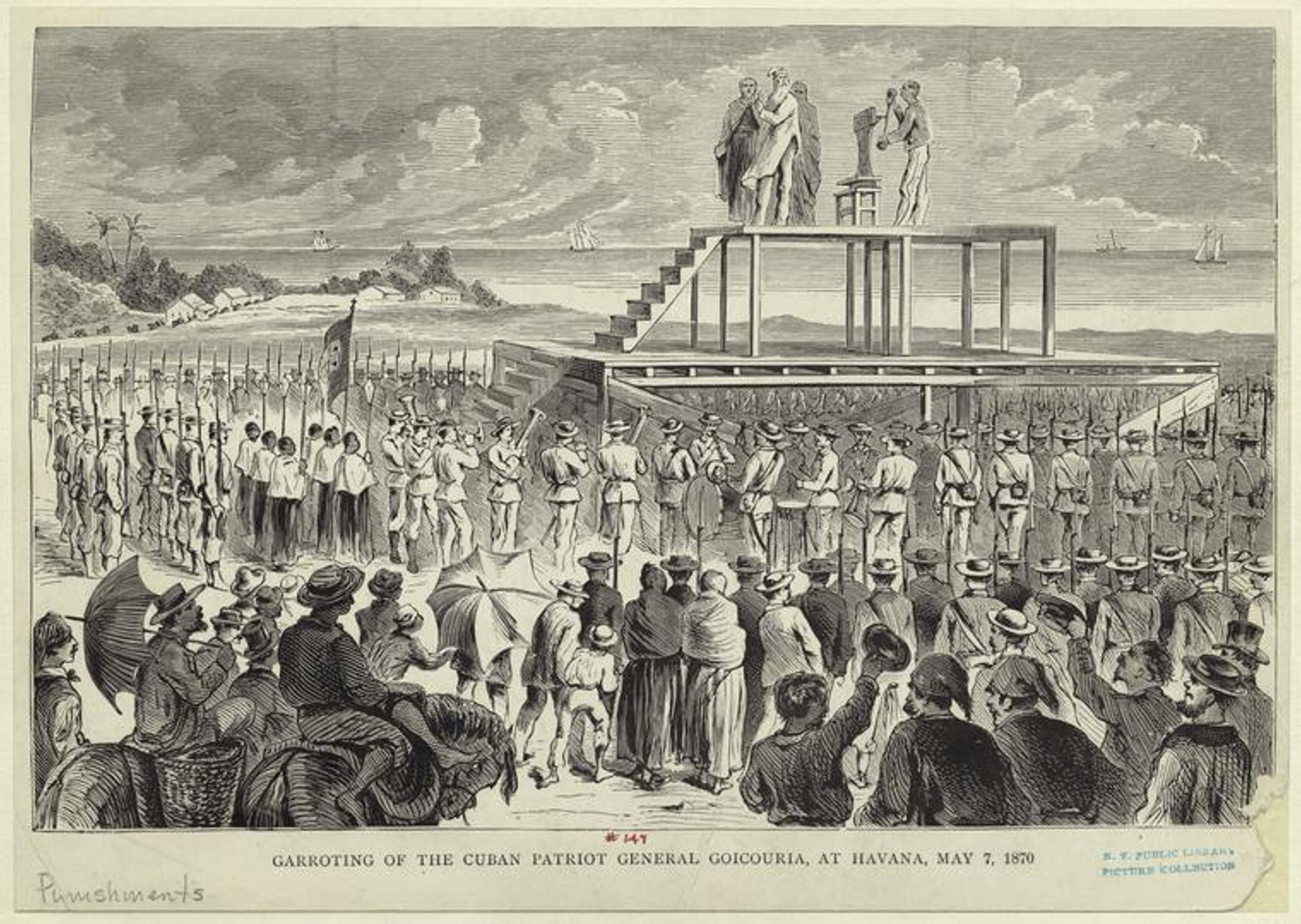
Garroting of the Cuban patriot Gen. Domingo de Goicouria, at Havana, May 7, 1870

In May 1870, Goicouria traveled to Cuba from Nassau on the schooner USS Herald. He landed on Guajaba Island and became separated from his companions. Spanish military authorities secured the key and two sailors belonging to the Spanish man-of-war Isabel la Catolica eventually captured Gen. Goicouria. Upon being transported and detained in Puerto Príncipe, he was confronted by Gen. Antonio Caballero y Fernández de Rodas. He explained to Rodas that he had planned to leave the island with Gen. Jordan, but was retained by President Carlos Manuel de Céspedes for business. Céspedes had tasked him with an important commission to Juárez in Mexico, and on his way to complete it, he was intercepted by the Delamater-built gunboat Soldado and forced onto Guajaba Key.

On the 6th of May 1870, he was transported on the steamer Triumfo to be held at Castillo del Príncipe in Havana. A Drumhead court-martial was held, and he was condemned to death for his role in the Lopez Expedition in 1850. On the following morning, he was marched from the castle to the scaffold with his hands tied and under heavy guard to be executed by garrote.

== Death ==
Domingo de Goicouria was executed on May 7, 1870, in Havana, Cuba.
