= Tomás Collazo Tejada =

Cuban army general (1866–1924)

Tomás Collazo
- Born: Tomás Collazo y Tejada; August 15, 1866; Santiago de Cuba, Captaincy General of Cuba, Spanish Empire
- Died: March 30, 1924 (aged 57); Havana, Cuba
- Relatives: Enrique Collazo Tejada; Guillermo Collazo Tejada
- Military career
- Allegiance: Republic of Cuba
- Branch: Cuban Liberation Army
- Rank: Colonel
- Conflicts: Cuban War of Independence

Tomás Collazo Tejada (August 15, 1866 - March 30, 1924) was a Cuban statesman, mambí Colonel, and veteran of the Cuban War of Independence.

== Early history ==
Tomás Collazo y Tejada was born in Santiago de Cuba in Santiago de Cuba Province on August 15, 1866.

He was the youngest of three brothers including Enrique Collazo Tejada and Guillermo Collazo Tejada.

== Cuban Liberation Army ==
He joined the ranks of the Cuban Liberation Army. In September 1895, Gen. Tomas and Enrique Collazo led an expedition that was reported by the Spanish consuls in Florida. Returning to Cuba on the Horsa Expedition, they landed on the southern coast of Santiago de Cuba in November 1895. He was quickly incorporated into Gen. José Maceo's mambí force.

Tomás Collazo Tejada held the position of Colonel and Chief of Staff of the Eastern Department in 1896.

== Political career ==
In 1910, the appointment of General Tomás Collazo as Extraordinary Envoy and Minister Plenipotentiary of the Republic in Paris was submitted for Senate approval. He was soon assigned as the Envoy Extradordinary and Minister Plenipotentiary to the President of France. In February 1911, he attended United States Ambassador to France Hon. Robert Bacon's luncheon at the Embassy in Paris as the Minister of Cuba. He held the position until his resignation in 1913.

== Death ==
Tomás Collazo y Tejada died in Havana, Cuba on March 30, 1924.
