= Miguel Aldama =

Cuban revolutionary and politician (1821-1888)

- Born: Miguel Aldama y Alfonso; October 4, 1821; Havana, Captaincy General of Cuba, Spanish Empire
- Died: March 15, 1888 (aged 66); Havana, Captaincy General of Cuba, Spanish Empire
- Burial place: Green-Wood Cemetery
- Military career
- Allegiance: Cuba
- Conflicts: Ten Years' War

Miguel Aldama (October 4, 1821 - March 5, 1888) was a Cuban revolutionary, merchant, and politician.

== Early life ==
Miguel de Aldama y Alfonso was born in Havana, Spanish Cuba on October 4, 1821. He was born to Domingo Aldama y Arrechaga and Rosa Alfonso y Soler. Aldama was described as Criollo. As a successful merchant, he led one of the island's most affluent families. Alongside his mansion, the Palacio de Aldama, in Prado and a considerable stake in the Havana Railroad, he owned five of Cuba's largest estates.

== Ten Years' War ==
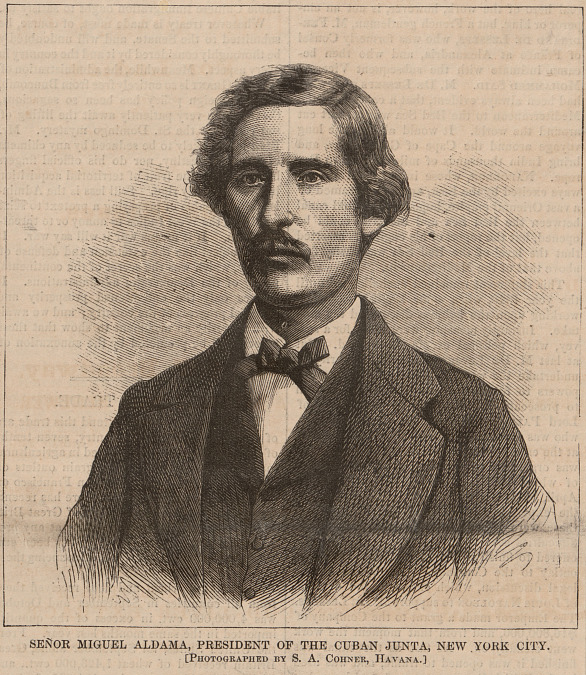
Señor Miguel Aldama, President of the Cuban Junta, New York City.

Aldama became part of a reformist delegation led by José Morales Lemus in late 1866, traveling to Madrid, Spain to negotiate reforms with the Spanish government. With the failure of these negotiations, the delegates aligned themselves with those who initiated the Ten Years' War in 1868.

Aldama served on the Revolutionary Committee of Havana with fellow members José Morales Lemus, Antonio Fernández Bramosio, José Manuel Mestre, and José Antonio Echeverría.

His property was seized by Spanish authorities on the orders of Spanish Military Governor Domingo Dulce, who mandated an embargo on April 1, 1869, against Cuban properties and assets.

On May 10, 1869, Aldama arrived at the Port of New York in the United States after departing Cuba's capital on board the steamship S.S. Morro Castle.

In November 1869, the revolutionary Cuban Junta was reorganized in New York City and Aldama assumed the role of the president of the Cuban Junta. The Cuban Junta in New York was formed to finance the uprising against the colonial regime of Spain in Cuba. A court-martial was held on November 9, 1870, in which Aldama and others associated with the second junta of New York were convicted of treason and rebellion, with a death sentence by garrote awaiting them if they fell into Spanish hands.

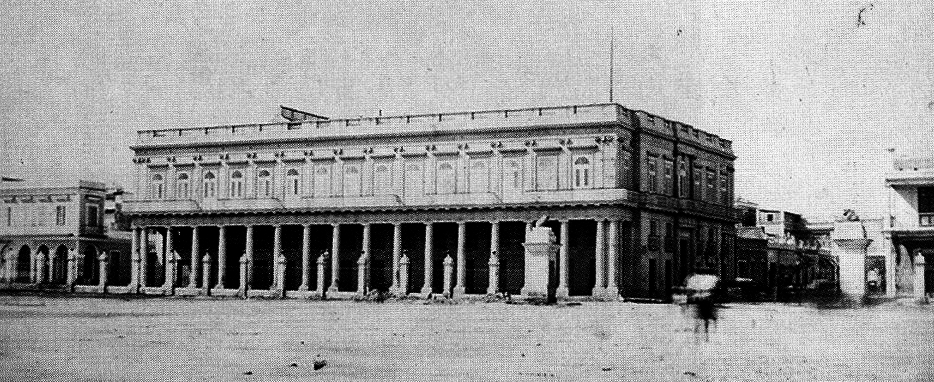
Palacio Aldama, Havana, Cuba.

In 1878, following the Pact of Zanjón, his palatial residence, near Plaza del Vapor, was returned by the colonial government but never again occupied by the Aldama family.

== Death ==
Miguel Aldama died on March 15, 1888, in Havana, Cuba. His remains were sailed to New York on the steamer City of Washington. Upon arrival of his body, he was buried in Green-Wood Cemetery.

== Honors ==
In 1956, he was commemorated on a 4¢ postage stamp in Cuba.
