= Luisa Pérez de Zambrana =

Cuban writer (1837–1922)

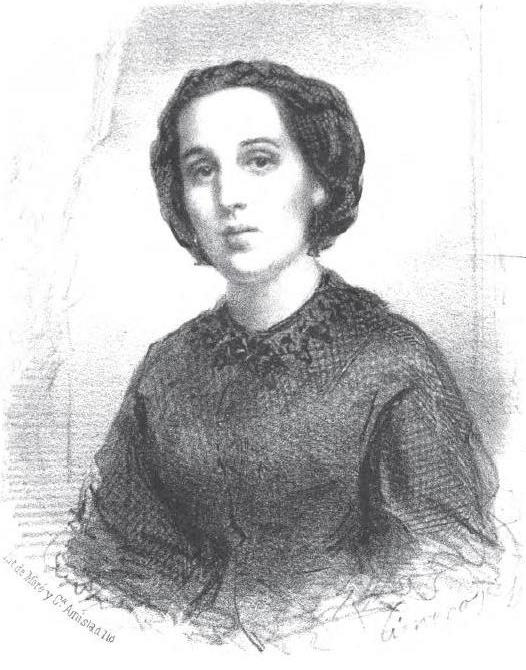

Luisa Pérez de Zambrana (25 August 1837, El Cobre – 25 March 1922, Havana) was a Cuban writer and translator. She was one of Cuba's greatest poets.

== Life ==
Luisa Pérez y Montes de Oca, was born near El Cobre, Cuba, in 1837. Her sister was the poet, Julia Pérez Montes de Oca. In 1858, Luisa married Dr. Ramon Zambrana, an eminent man of letters of Havana. She wrote a lot when young, and published a volume of poems in 1856. In addition to her poems she wrote Angelica and Estrella and other novels, and she also translated works from French and Italian.

== See also ==
- List of people on the postage stamps of Cuba
