= José Morales Lemus =

Cuban revolutionary and politician (1808–1870)

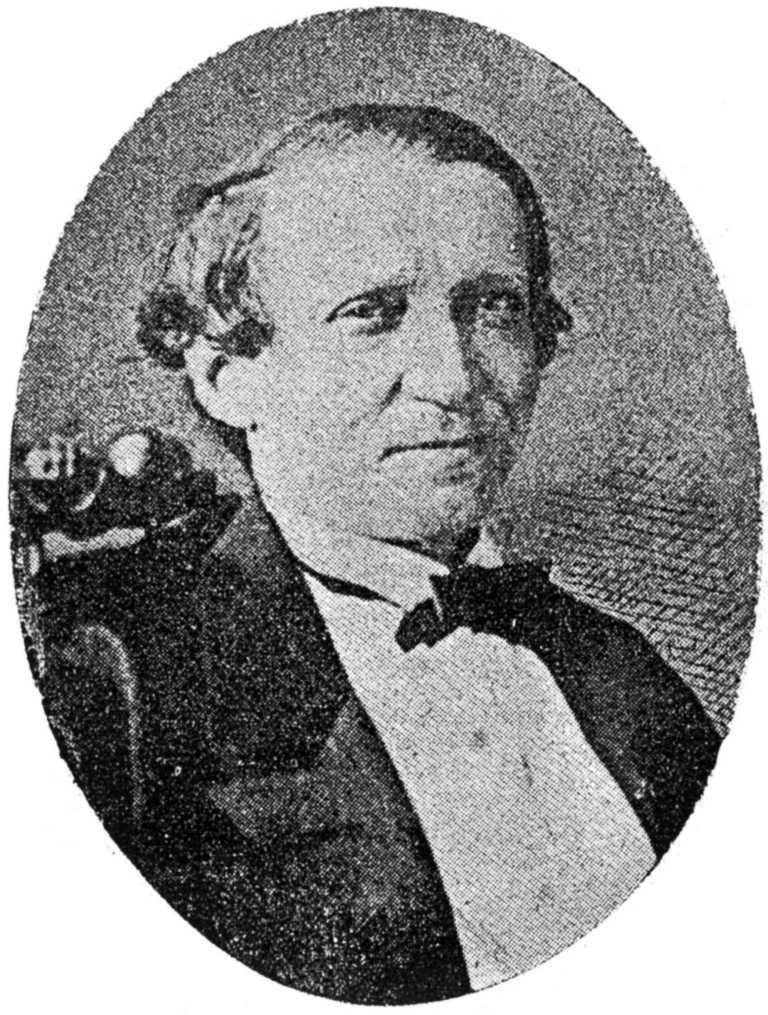
- Born: José Gregorio Morales Lemus; May 10, 1808; Gibara, Holguín Province, Captaincy General of Cuba, Spanish Empire
- Died: June 28, 1870 (aged 62); Brooklyn, New York
- Military career
- Allegiance: Cuba
- Conflicts: Ten Years' War

José Morales Lemus (May 10, 1808 – June 28, 1870) was a Cuban revolutionary, merchant and lawyer.

== Biography ==
José Gregorio Morales Lemus was born in Gibara, Holguín Province, Spanish Cuba on May 10, 1808. His origins trace back to the Canary Islands through his parents. He spent his childhood and received his early education in Havana.

Morales Lemus completed his legal education and was admitted to practice law in 1835. As a lawyer, he worked in the Havana district of the Real Audiencia, which was the highest judicial body in Spanish colonies, including Cuba.

In the mid-1860s, he served as both a director and magistrate for the Sagua La Grande Railway, established in 1863 and based in Havana.

In 1863, he established the periodical El Siglo (English: The Century) in Havana to advocate for reforms in Cuba. In 1866, the government of Isabella II appointed a commission to assess the situation in Cuba. Leading a deputation of reformists including José Antonio Saco and Nicholas Azcarate to Madrid, Morales Lemus sought to negotiate their positions on the Spanish colonial administration of the colonies. The delegation pushed for economic and political reforms as well as the abolition of slavery. On April 27, 1867, the Cuban delegation's hearings concluded with the Ministry of Overseas (Spanish: Junta Informativa de Ultramar) rejecting all reform proposals and subsequently imposing a higher tax. When the talks did not produce the desired outcomes, he decided to join the Ten Years' War, Cuba's first war of independence against Spain in 1868.

Morales Lemus was a founding member of the Revolutionary Committee of Havana along with Miguel Aldama, Antonio Fernández Bramosio, José Manuel Mestre, and José Antonio Echeverría.

Upon fleeing Cuba in 1869, he was appointed president of the Cuban Junta in New York. In the United States, the junta handled the financial and business affairs of the Republic of Cuba in Arms.

When the government was formed on April 10, 1869, Morales Lemus was assigned to the Diplomatic corps of the Republic of Cuba in Arms. At Berrocal in Artemisa, Morales Lemus was appointed as Envoy extraordinary and Minister Plenipotentiary to the United States by President Carlos Manuel de Céspedes.

On April 15, 1869, Captain General Domingo Dulce ordered an embargo on the property of Morales Lemus and 15 others, including Nestor Ponce de Leon and José María Mora, for aiding the insurrection.

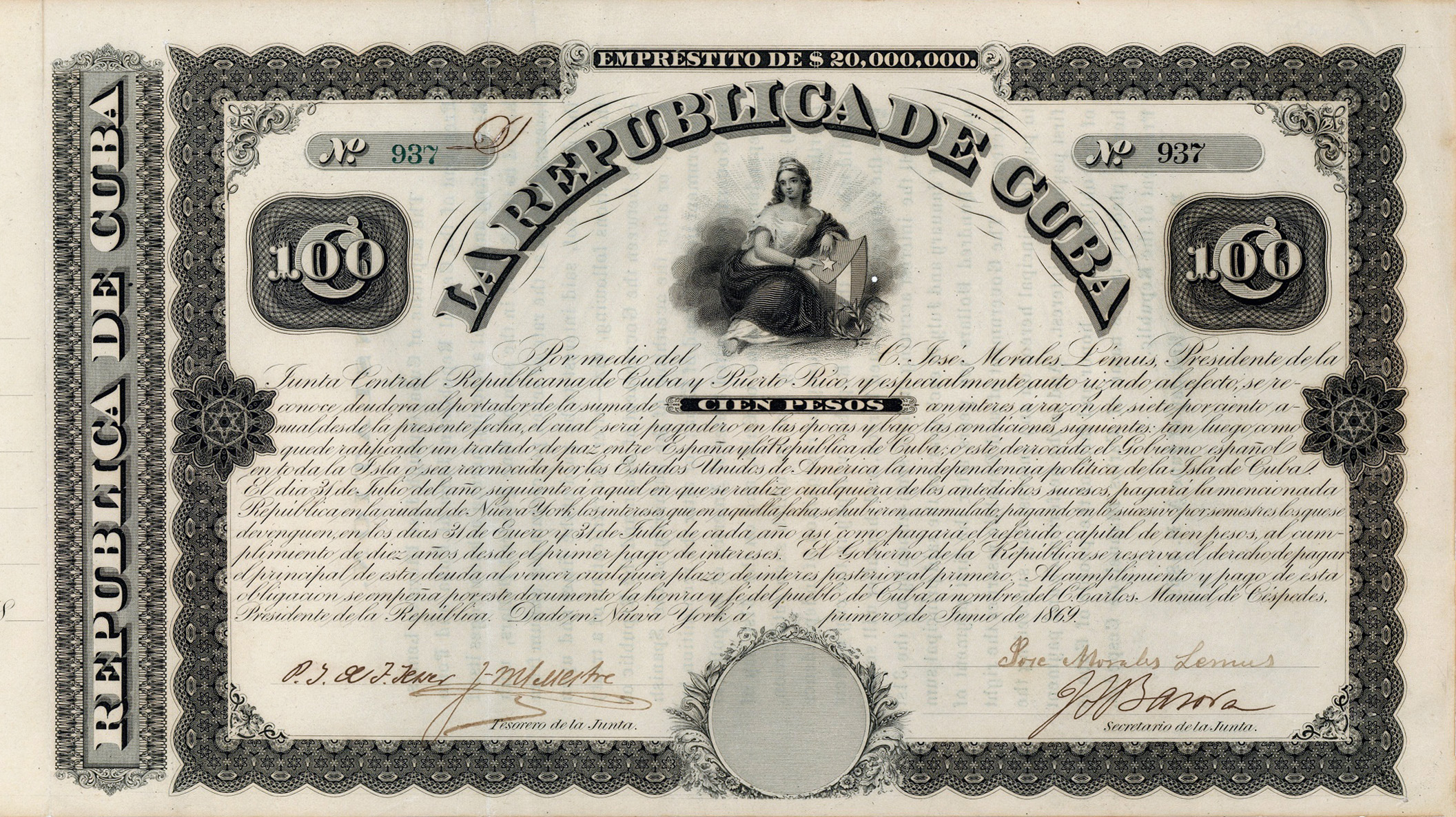
Cuba Liberty Loan, June 1, 1869

Morales Lemus, Col. William A.C. Ryan, and others were indicted on April 16, 1869, by the Federal Grand Jury of the United States District Court for the Southern District of New York for violating the Neutrality Act of 1818 by initiating a military expedition in Cuba on May 1, 1869. Receiving news of the indictment and arrest warrant, Morales Lemus turned himself in and was released on bail.

When the Junta issued a 100-peso bond on June 1, 1869, to fund the Cuban uprising against Spanish colonial rule, it was signed by Morales Lemus. The Spanish colonial government seized the stocks, bonds, and securities by the close of 1870.

== Death ==
José Morales Lemus died on June 28, 1870, in Brooklyn, New York.
