= Enrique Collazo (general) =

Cuban army general (1848-1925)

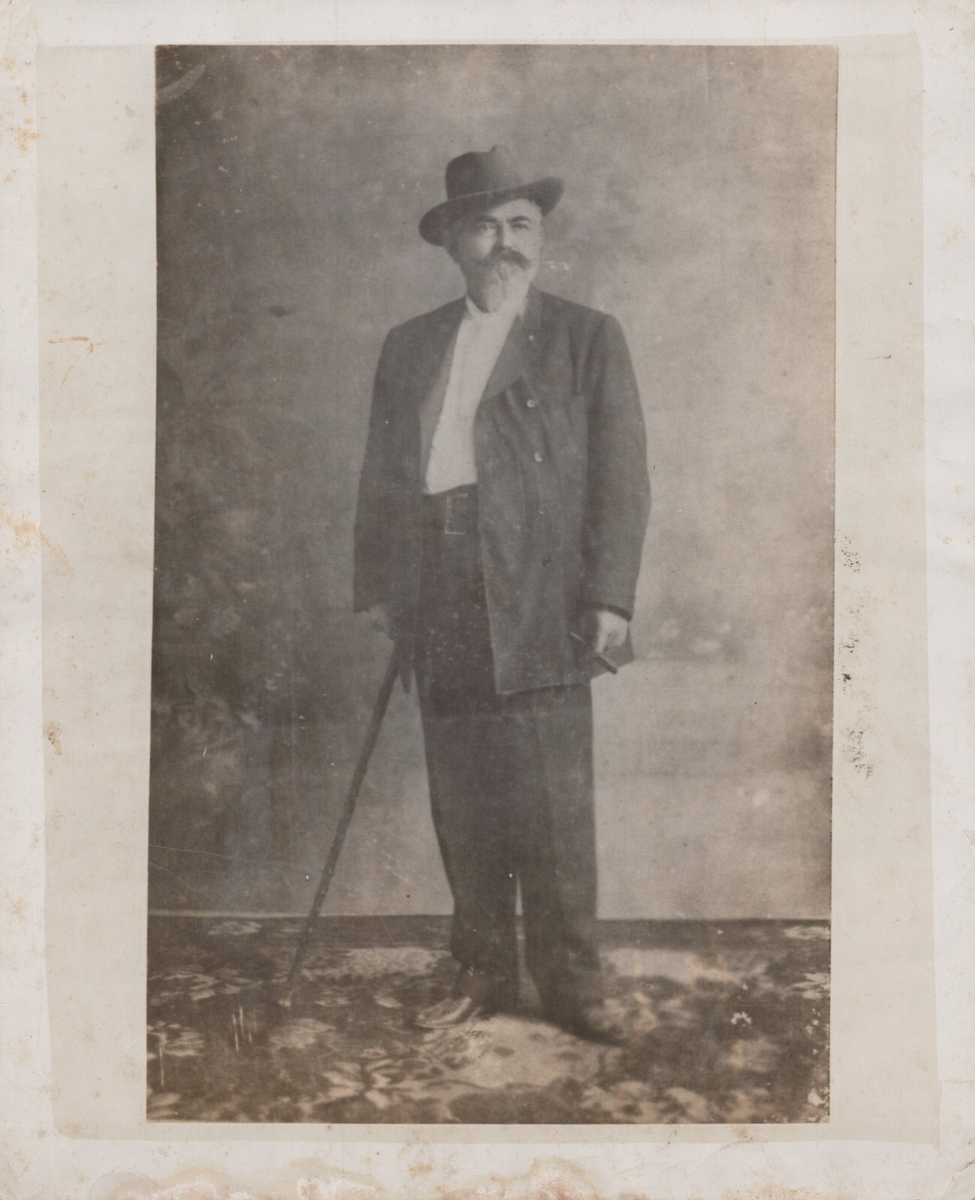
- Collazo in the 1910s
- Born: Enrique Collazo y Tejada; 28 May 1848; Santiago de Cuba, Captaincy General of Cuba, Spanish Empire
- Died: 13 March 1925 (aged 76); Havana, Cuba
- Relatives: Tomás Collazo Tejada; Guillermo Collazo Tejada
- Military career
- Allegiance: Republic of Cuba
- Branch: Cuban Liberation Army
- Rank: General
- Conflicts: Ten Years' War; Cuban War of Independence; Spanish-American War

Enrique Collazo Tejada (28 May 1848 - 13 March 1925) was a Cuban writer, army general, and distinguished veteran of the Ten Years' War and War of Independence.

== Early history ==
Enrique Collazo y Tejada was born in Santiago de Cuba on 28 May 1848. He was the elder brother of Guillermo Collazo Tejada and Tomás Collazo Tejada.

During his early years, Collazo lived in Spain and attended the Academia de Artilleria of Segovia, a Spanish military academy from which he graduated in 1866.

== Ten Years' War ==
He left Spain in 1869 to join the Cuban uprising which became the first war of independence, the Ten Years' War. Collazo was a troop commander in the Cuban Liberation Army. He became Gen. Máximo Gómez's adjutant and reached the rank of colonel.

In 1893, Collazo wrote and published Desde Yara basta el Zanjón. Aputanciones históricas (English: From Yara to Zanjón: Historical notes) in Havana.

== The Necessary War ==
Col. Enrique Collazo was a member of the third Revolutionary Cuban Junta. Collazo, along with José Martí and Gen. Máximo Gómez, signed the orders to commence the revolution. General Collazo led insurgent forces in the 1895 War of Independence.

In 1898, he was appointed a brigadier general of the Mayarí brigade in the Cuban Liberation Army.

== Spanish–American War ==
Collazo was a member of the staff of the late Gen. Calixto García and his trusted aide. Preceding the outbreak of the Spanish–American War, he escorted U.S. Army lieutenant Andrew S. Rowan on his mission to Cuba to deliver a message to General García. Collazo also accompanied him on his return to the U.S.

In 1905, he published Los Americanos en Cuba (English: The Americans in Cuba), analyzing U.S. intervention in Cuba during the Spanish-American War.

== Politics ==
Collazo was elected in 1909 to represent the Havana district in the Cuban House of Representatives, where he served until 1911.

He published Cuba Heroica (English: Heroic Cuba) in 1912.

== Death ==
Enrique Collazo y Tejada died in Havana, Cuba on 13 March 1925.
