= Julia Pérez Montes de Oca =

Cuban poet (1839–1875)

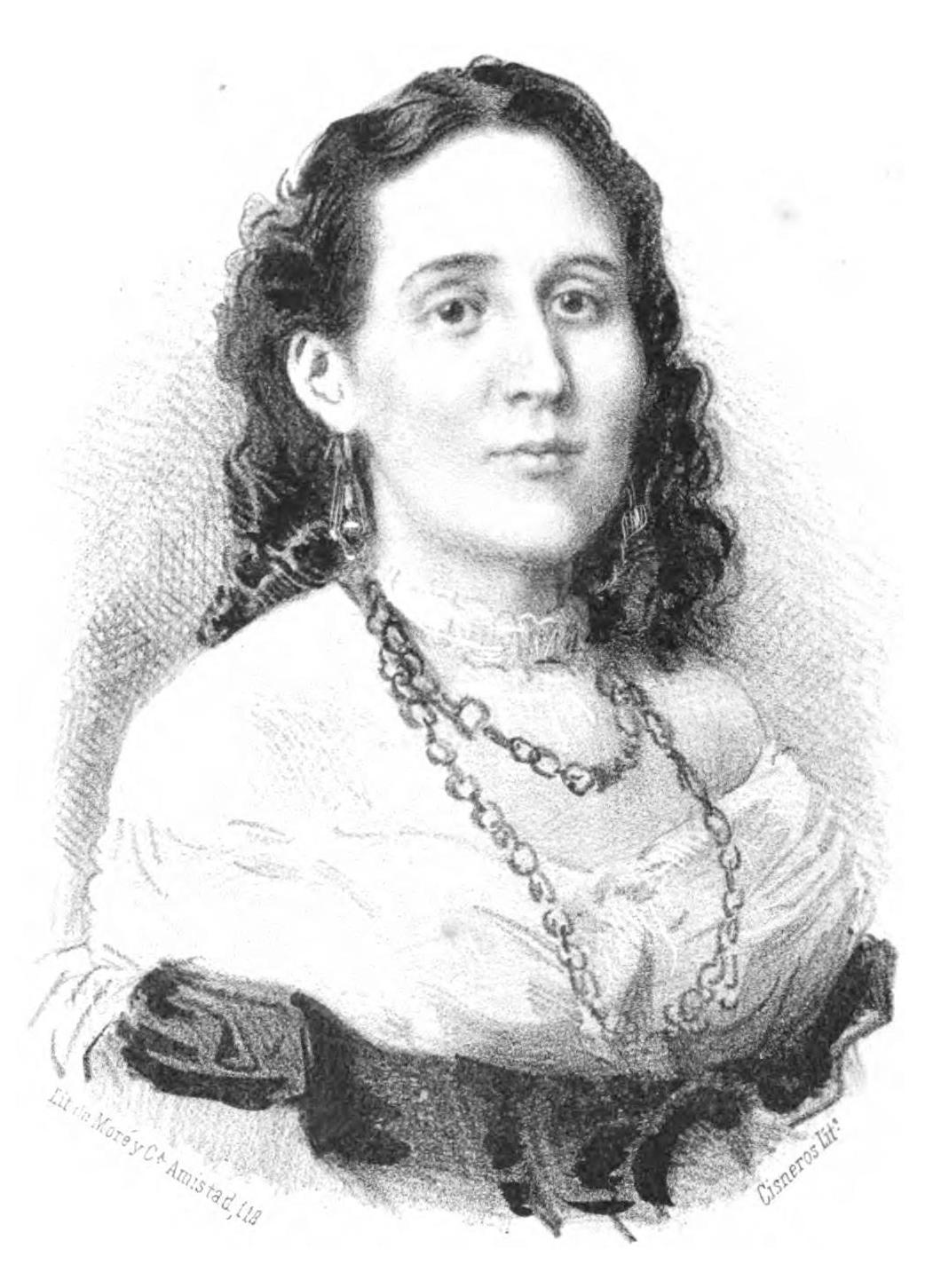
Julia Pérez Montes de Oca

Julia Pérez Montes de Oca (1839 – September 25, 1875) was a Cuban poet, sister of the poet Luisa Pérez de Zambrana.

== Early life and education ==
Julia Pérez Montes de Oca was born in Santiago de Cuba, Cuba, in 1839. There, she received her education. Her older sister was the poet Luisa Perez de Zambrana, with whom she always maintained a good friendship as well as with Luisa's husband, Dr. Ramon Zambrana. In fact, the family's connection to Zamabrana was such that when Luisa married Ramon, the whole family moved to Havana.

== Career ==
Interested in poetry from a young age, Pérez published her first poems in the newspapers Redactor de Santiago de Cuba and Kaleidoscopio de la Habana, and later collaborated with other Cuban and foreign journals. She attended artistic and literary meetings, where she recited her compositions. Her work was praised both by her sister and by the press of the time, who quoted one of the readings as "moving".

Her poetry was part of the second Romanticism, of a later character, covered different genres, and dealt with various topics. Generally, however, in addition to romantic features, Pérez's work was more similar to classicism, with constant references to the locus amoenus, reminiscent of Garcilaso de la Vega. After the death of Dr. Zambrana, Pérez's verses developed a tragic tone; there was also a suggestion of unrequited love. In collaboration with other poets of the time, Pérez published some poems in El álbum cubano de lo bueno y lo bello, founded and directed by Gertrudis Gómez de Avellaneda, in 1860.

== Death and legacy ==
Pérez died September 25, 1875, of tuberculosis, probably in the El Jardín house, the residence of Cornelio Souchay and Angélica Zambrana, in Artemisa, Cuba. She was buried in the local cemetery. Some have said that she committed suicide, according to the last verses she left written, but others dismiss it because her death certificate records that she received Anointing of the sick.

Though she never published a collection of poems in her lifetime, a collection of her poetry was published posthumously entitled, Poesías, in 1875 in Barcelona. A more complete edition was published in 1957.
