= Jeannette Ryder =

American philanthropist and animal welfare activist

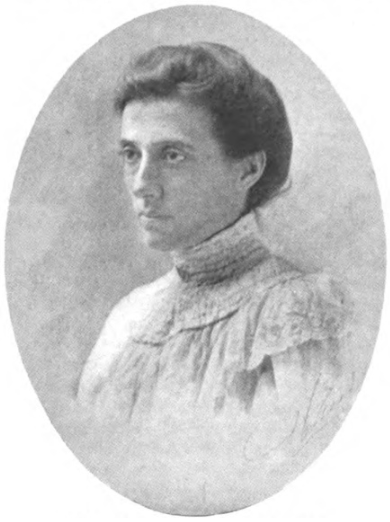
- Born: Jeannette Ford Ryder; 11 June 1866; Wisconsin
- Died: 11 April 1931 (aged 64); Cuba
- Occupation: Philanthropist
- Spouse: Clifford Ryder (m. 1891)

Jeannette Ryder (11 June 1866 – 11 April 1931) was an American animal welfare activist and philanthropist who lived in Cuba at the beginning of the 20th century. She founded Bando de Piedad a humanitarian organization in 1906.

== Biography ==
Ryder was born in Wisconsin on 11 June 1866. She married Clifford Ryder a physician in 1891 and they moved to Cuba in 1899. She founded the Bando de Piedad (also known as the Society for the Protection of Children, Animals and Plants) in 1906 as a Bands of Mercy organization. She enlisted children in her Band of Mercy to carry injured animals to her shelter. Her Bands of Mercy was a democratically elected organization with a leadership chosen by vote. Poor children received free medical care at her clinic across the street from her animal shelter. Ryder was known for her opposition to bullfighting. A 1914 entry for Ryder in the Woman's Who's Who of America commented that "she has done most effective service in the suppression of bull-fights and other cruel customs formerly prevalent in Cuba".

Ryder died from spinal meningitis on 11 April 1931. She was buried in the Colón Cemetery in Havana. Her grave is known as the "loyalty grave" because her dog Rinti lay at the foot of the grave and refused the food and water offered by the caretakers of the cemetery until she died.

The animal was buried next to its owner and is one of the two animals officially buried in the Colón cemetery. A recumbent sculpture (the only one of its kind in the necropolis) representing Rinti who rests at the foot of the tomb was erected in 1945. Since then this tomb has been known as "of loyalty" or "the tomb of the little dog".

== Recognitions ==
In July 1957, to commemorate the 50th anniversary of the founding of the Bando de Piedad, the Ministry of Communications of the Republic of Cuba issued two stamps of 4 and 12 cents respectively honoring Ryder and her legacy.
