= Guillermo Collazo =

Cuban artist (1850–1896)

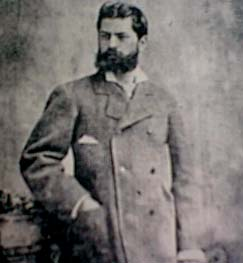
- Guillermo Collazo (date unknown)
- Born: Guillermo Collazo y Tejada; 7 June 1850; Santiago de Cuba, Captaincy General of Cuba, Spanish Empire
- Died: 26 September 1896 (aged 46); Paris, France
- Relatives: Enrique Collazo Tejada; Tomás Collazo Tejada

Guillermo Collazo Tejada (7 June 1850, Santiago de Cuba - 26 September 1896, Paris) was a Cuban painter and advocate for independence.

== Biography ==
Collazo was born into an established colonial family. His artistic talent was noticed at an early age by one of his instructors at school in Santiago. While there, he was also motivated to become an independence fighter following the death by firing squad of one of his cousins at age 17. At the beginning of the Ten Years' War, his parents, aware of his activities and concerned for his safety, hastily put him on board a ship headed for the United States.

Collazo arrived in New York with no resources, speaking no English. Eventually, he found a job touching up and coloring photographs at a small shop in the Bowery. After a short time there, he found work in the studios of Napoleon Sarony, and was able to save enough money to open his own art studio, enjoying great success as a portrait painter. He also continued to raise money for revolutionary causes, and helped José Martí get his first writing job at The Hour, a magazine where Collazo worked as an illustrator.

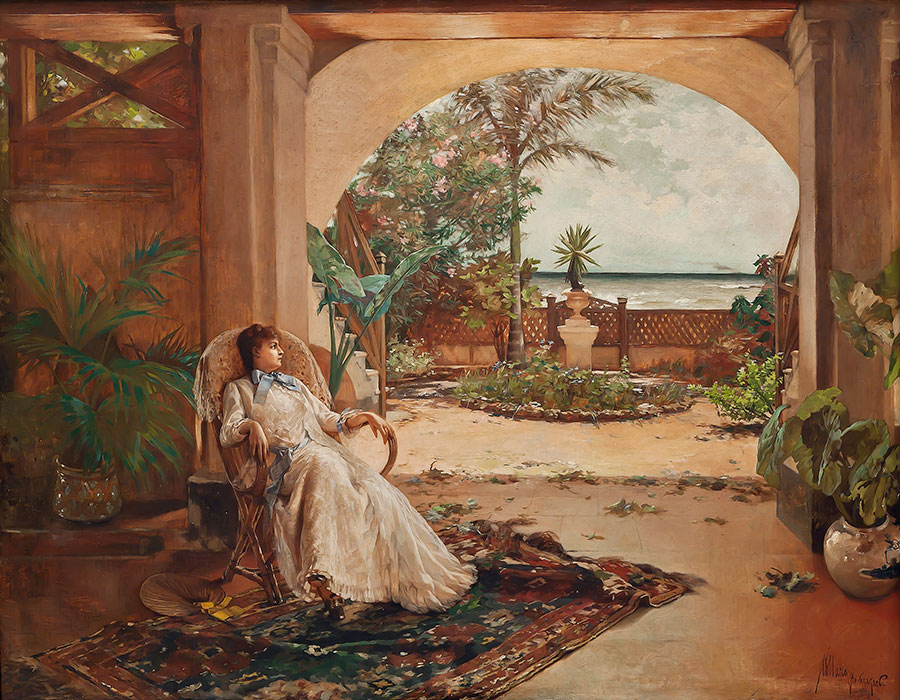
The Siesta (1888)

In 1883 Collazo returned to Cuba, opening a studio in Havana. Five years later, hampered by the increasingly oppressive political atmosphere there, he decided to go to Paris, where he opened a large studio which became a meeting point for the Cuban exile community and, occasionally, a place for planning revolutionary activities. In 1890, two of his works were selected for an exhibition at the Salon.

In his final years, Collazo devoted himself to sculpture because an addiction to narcotics had affected his eyesight and he was unable to focus clearly enough to paint. He died in Paris and, in 1899, after the War of Independence, his family brought his remains back to Cuba.

Collazo's works were not exhibited in Cuba until 1933, when the architect Evelio Govantes (1886–1981) organized a showing at the Lyceum with paintings borrowed from Collazo's friends and family. In 1976, his painting "The Patio" was used on one of a series of stamps honoring Cuban painters.

Collazo's brother, Enrique (1848–1921), was a high-ranking commander in the Liberation Army.
