= José Francisco Lemus =

Cuban revolutionary and leader of the Suns and Rays of Bolívar

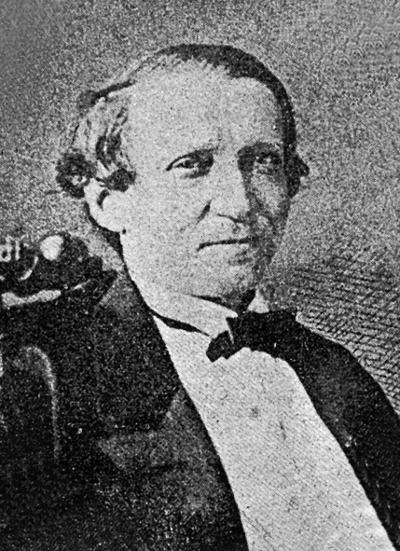
- Born: José Francisco Lemus y Escámez; Havana, Captaincy General of Cuba, Spanish Empire
- Military career
- Allegiance: Cuba; Gran Colombia
- Rank: Colonel

José Francisco Lemus was a Cuban revolutionary and businessman who led one of the earliest secret societies advocating for Cuban independence and sought to align with Bolívar's revolutionary efforts in Latin America. He was the leader of the Suns and Rays of Bolívar during the events surrounding the Revolution of the Suns and Rays

== Biography ==
=== Early life ===
José Francisco Lemus y Escámez was born in Havana, Spanish Cuba, in the late 18th century. He was of Creole descent and the son of a Spanish naval officer.

=== Suns and Rays of Bolívar ===
Lemus left Havana in the mid-1810s for the United States. In Philadelphia, he established contact with Simon Bolívar's envoys and was given the rank of colonel in Bolívar's Colombian Army of Independence. He returned to Cuba in the early 1820s. In 1821, Lemus founded the masonic lodge, Suns and Rays of Bolívar, alongside José Fernández Madrid, José María Heredia y Heredia, and Sévère Courtois. They planned an uprising that would proclaim Cuba as the independent Republic of "Cubanacán" and sought to abolish slavery. The conspirators planned to invade Cuba by coordinating the combined action of Colombian troops loyal to Simón Bolívar with the movement in Cuba. Lemus spread the conspiracy through Cuban masonic lodges, including the Rational Knights of Matanzas and the Triangular Chain of Camagüey (Spanish: Cadena Triangular de Camagüey). By the summer of 1823, government spies working for Francisco Dionisio Vives had suppressed the separatist plot just before the uprising, leading the Captain General to issue arrest orders for the conspirators. On August 19, 1823, Lemus was detained in Guanabacoa, Havana, as some co-conspirators fled abroad, and he was later exiled and sent to Spain.

Upon escaping Spain, Lemus took refuge in Mexico and aligned with the Cuban Liberty Promotion Board (Spanish: Junta Promotora de la Libertad Cubana), founded on July 4, 1825, in Mexico City.
