= Cuban Junta =

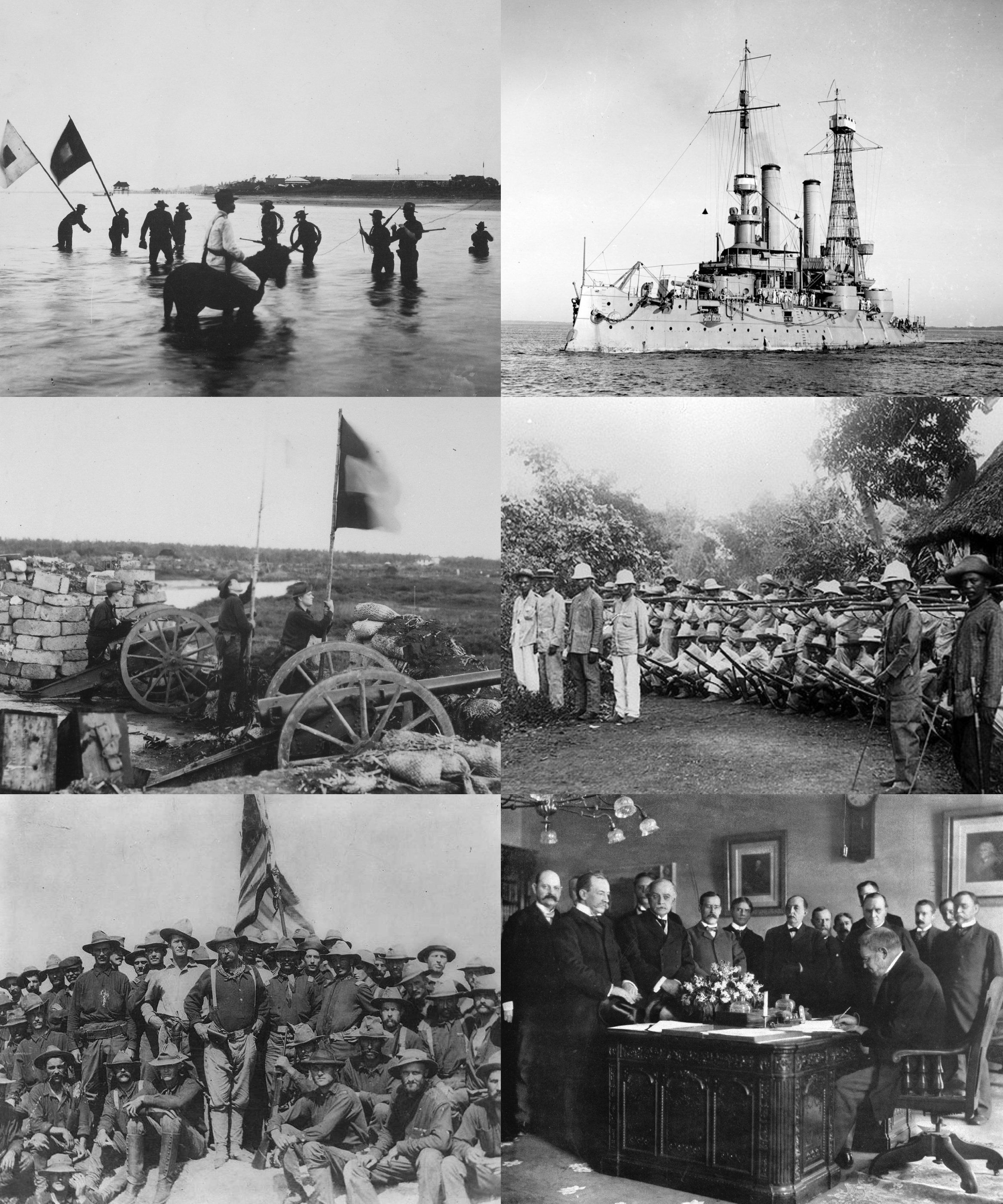
Spanish American War (April 21 – August 13, 1898), this was a major time period of a war between Spain and the United States of America.

The Cuban Junta was a group of Cuban nationalists that advocated for Cuban independence before and during the Spanish-American War (April 21 – August 13, 1898). The Junta was primarily made up of naturalized Cubans located in the United States. The main goal of the Junta was to free Cuba from the Spanish Empire by securing financial and military aid from the United States. The Junta used the American press as a device to distribute propaganda on Spanish rule in Cuba, fostering support among American citizens. The deciding factor that sent the United States into the Spanish-American War was the publication of the De Lôme Letter by the revolutionaries of the Cuban Junta. The letter was written by the Spanish ambassador to the United States, Enrique Dupuy de Lôme, and was very critical of President William McKinley. The publication of the letter heightened tensions between the United States and Spain, and President McKinley was forced to confront Spain; he did so in demanding that Cuba be granted independence, which resulted in the beginning of the Spanish-American War on April 21, 1898.

There were three Cuban Juntas established in the United States between 1848 and 1898. They each had different leadership, but similar goals of using aid from the United States to achieve Cuban independence. The third Junta was finally successful in 1898 with the defeat of the Spanish. Although Spain had been expelled, Cuba wasn't officially declared independent until the United States occupation ended in 1902.

== History ==
In the early nineteenth century, Cuban communities in the United States expanded significantly. Some of the main cities the Cubans resided in were New York, New Orleans and Tampa which served as places of refuge. Many Cuban emigrants started their journey over to America in the 1840s, inspired by the independence movement. Many people saw the potential advantages of annexation, however, they were concerned about slavery and the United States' slavery laws.

=== The First Cuban Junta ===
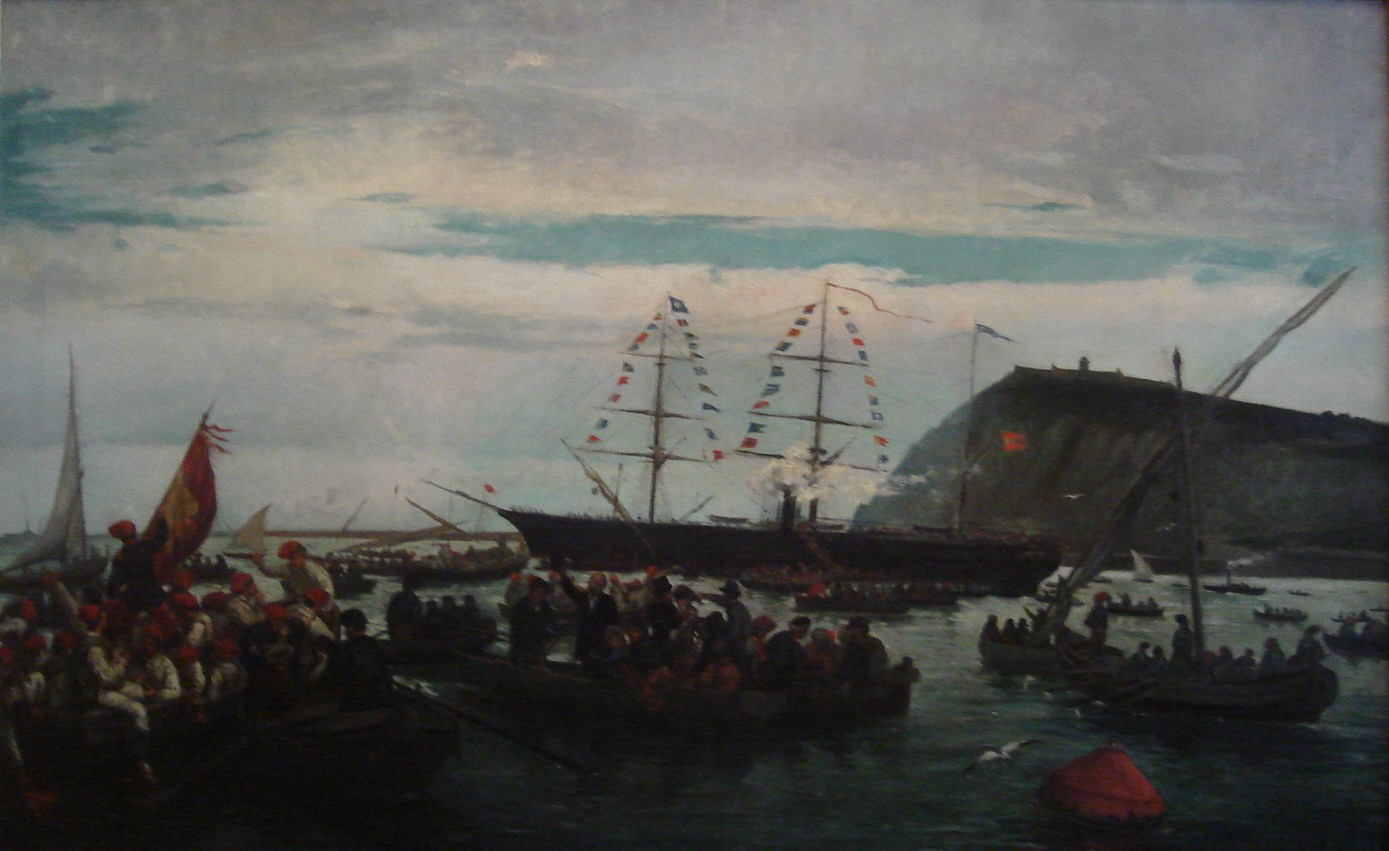
Image of the Ten Years War between Spain and Cuba

The first of the Juntas was founded in New York in 1848 and lasted until 1855. It was started by Cuban leaders Don Gaspar Betancourt Cisneros, Don Manuel De Jesus Arango, Don Domingo de Goicouria, Don Jose Elias Hernandez, and Don Porfirio Valiente with financial support from Havana, their main goal to encourage United States politicians to purchase the land from the Spaniards. This was the first attempt by Cubans to get the United States to annex Cuba. After some failed annexation attempts, the Junta collaborated with filibusterers like Narciso López and John Quitman. The United States government did not tolerate this activity and tried to shut it down. This concluded with Spain making it clear they were not willing to sell the land, leading to the abandonment of the first Junta in 1855.

=== The Second Cuban Junta ===
Before the Second Cuban Junta, annexation was becoming less popular amongst the Cubans and the national leaders at the time. The second Junta was rallied in 1869 during the Ten Years' War, also in New York, with the same goal of ensuring the annexation by the United States. The headquarters, based at 71 Broadway in Manhattan, occupied a suite of three rooms on the second floor, overlooking Trinity Churchyard. The second Cuban Junta of New York was led by José Morales Lemus who was succeeded by Miguel Aldama. There were many critics of the Junta at this time that ultimately wanted "absolute independence" for Cuba rather than being financially obligated to the United States. During the war they wanted a victory over the Spaniards that would lead to their freedom. Members of the Junta still fought for what they thought was going to be best for Cuba. Despite their efforts to spread awareness by the end of the Ten Years War annexation once again seemed improbable.

=== The Third Cuban Junta ===
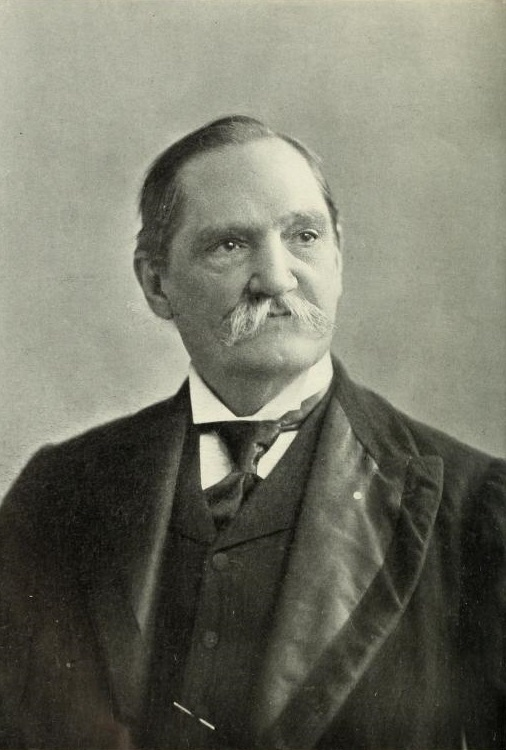
Tomás Estrada Palma, Cuban politician and become the first President of Cuba in 1901.

The third Cuban Junta was led by Tomás Estrada Palma, elected president of the Cuban Junta in 1895. The success that finally came from the third Junta was largely due to those who came before in the first and second Juntas. José Martí and Tomás were key leaders that founded the third Junta.

== Activities ==
=== Propaganda ===
Cuban revolutionaries did not believe that independence from Spain was possible without both military and ideological aid from the United States. The United States had not shown any inclination that it was planning to intervene, even during the Ten Years' War. In pursuit of securing American aid, the Cuban Junta launched a United States-based propaganda campaign that employed the use of sympathy meetings, carnivals, performances, articles published via American press sources, and its own newspaper. The campaign attempted to get Americans to sympathize with Cuba and apply to it the stereotypical American values of liberty and freedom. The Yellow journalism used by the Junta, bringing light to some of the worst parts of the Spanish rule of Cuba, also helped in gathering the support of American Citizens.

The Junta frequently hosted "Sympathy Meetings," rallies gathering sympathy to the Cuban independence cause among American citizens. They were often held in large cities and at times that were important in American politics; many sympathy meetings were held right before congress began their next session to create positive pressure on the congressmen. The Junta also hosted "Cuban Carnivals" in many cities, larger events that provided opportunities for fundraising. The primary goal was to foster American humanitarianism in the general public, while publishing stories of Cuban success and the failure of the Spanish Government to rule fairly.

=== Filibusters ===
A military filibuster refers to an unauthorized military expedition sent to a foreign territory to aid in political revolutionary efforts. This was one of the main strategies used by the Cuban Junta that kept the insurrection alive in Cuba. The United States did not approve of this practice as it violated international law, but was often unable to stop the ships, called filibusters, from leaving American ports and landing in Cuba. The large Cuban communities in Key West and Tampa, Florida, proved to be essential in the filibuster effort. Cubans in Florida were aware of the actions of the Cuban Junta, and would often sit on juries in filibuster trials, resulting in no convictions. This made it much more difficult for the law of the United States to be enforced. Florida Cubans also contributed a significant amount of money to the Junta to fund filibusters sending money and supplies to revolutionaries. Some Cubans contributed up to 10% of their incomes to the cause.

=== Beginning of the Spanish-American War ===
The entrance of the United States into the Spanish-American war was the primary goal of the Cuban Junta for fifty years, and on April 25, 1898, the goal was finally achieved. One of the factors that drove the United States to finally declare war on Cuba was the publication of the De Lôme letter, an international scandal. De Lôme, Spanish ambassador to the United States, had written a private correspondence to a Spaniard stationed in Cuba insulting the leadership of President McKinley. The letter asserted that he was weak, and implied that he would not challenge Spain's claim over Cuba. The letter, however, never made it into the hands of the intended recipient; instead, it was intercepted by Cuban Rebels who forwarded the message to the Cuban Junta based in New York. The Junta published the letter, causing significant strain on the relationship between Spain and the United States. This played a significant part in the decision made by the United States to declare war on Spain and officially enter the Spanish-American War, annexing Cuba, and completing the goals of the Cuban Junta.
