= José Antonio Saco =

Historian, writer, social critic, abolitionist

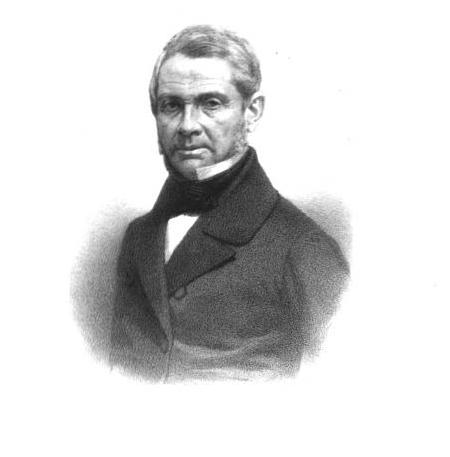
- Born: José Antonio Saco; May 7, 1797; Bayamo, Captaincy General of Cuba, Spanish Empire
- Died: September 26, 1879 (aged 82); Spain
- Notable work: Historia de la esclavitud

José Antonio Saco (May 7, 1797 – September 26, 1879) was a statesman, deputy to the Spanish Cortes, writer, social critic, publicist, essayist, anthropologist, historian, and one of the most notable Cuban figures from the nineteenth century.

== Life ==
A notable polymath, born in Bayamo, Cuba, on May 7, 1797, Saco entered the Seminary of San Carlos in Havana in 1809 under the tutelage of Félix Varela.

In 1821, he obtained the professorship in philosophy at the Seminary of San Carlos, occupying the same chair of his former professor, and began teaching philosophy at the institution.

From 1824 to 1826, he traveled to the United States, and in 1828 he returned to the city of New York, where he devoted himself to literary labors. Among these endeavors, he founded the Mensajero Quincenal, a scientific, political, and literary weekly.

In 1832 he returned to Havana, and held the editorship of Revista Bimestre Cubana, a magazine which published articles that ranged from immigration, abolition, statistics, and education, until 1834, year when he was expelled from the island on account of his liberal ideas and anti-slavery principles. During that same period when he held the position of editor for the periodical, he directed the College of Buena Vista.

In 1833 his numerous essays about roadways and living conditions, like vagrancy in Cuba, awarded him the first prizes in competitions held by the Sociedad Patriótica (Patriotic Society).

In 1836 he was elected to represent the eastern part of Cuba in the Spanish Cortes, but he did not take his seat, as the Madrid government deprived the colonies of representation. He drafted soon after, and set out to travel to other countries.

He travelled to Europe, establishing residence in Spain, where he would translate from Latin into Spanish the celebrated work of Heinecious on Roman Law. His translation was published several times thereafter.

In 1838, he published in Madrid Paralelo entre Cuba y algunas colonias inglesas.

Soon after, he toured Europe. He visited Germany, Italy, Austria, Portugal, and finally France.

In 1840, he established his residence in Paris, where he published Supresión del tráfico de esclavos en Cuba in 1845 which infuriated many slave-holders at the time, and as a result, his chances to reenter Cuba diminished.

In 1848, he published in Paris his Ideas sobre la incorporación de Cuba a los E. U.,, opposing in part the incorporation of Cuba to the United States, which was immediately translated into English and French, and by the American press.

In 1851, La situación política de Cuba y su remedio was published, and a couple of years later, in 1853, La cuestión Cubana.

In 1854 he had the chance to return to Cuba under the amnesty that was in effect, but did not return until a few years later, in 1861, with the sole purpose of establishing a journal in Madrid that would defend Cuban interests while he lived in France.

In 1866, he was elected in the city of Santiago de Cuba, as a delegate in Madrid to advocate political reforms for Cuba. He was part of the Committee of Inquiry led by José Morales Lemus, in which he took an active participation.

In 1878, he was reelected by the same city to the Spanish Cortes, but did not occupy the post due to his sudden death.

In the last years of his life, he began the voluminous work Historia de la esclavitud desde los tiempos más remotos, of which several volumes were published before his death.

Some of his other works include Historia de la esclavitud entre los Indios, and various articles on different subjects, which later have been compiled into Colección de papeles varios in 1882 in the city of Havana. Other minor works have been condensed into Papeles de Saco (Saco's papers) and Colección póstuma (Posthumous Collection).

=== Bibliography ===
- Saco, José Antonio (1879). Historia de la esclavitud de la raza africana en el Nuevo mundo y en especial en los paises américo-hispanos. Impresora de J. Jepús. p. 442.
- Saco, José Antonio (1858). Colección de papeles cientificos, históricos, politicos y de otros ramos sobre la isla de Cuba, Volume 1. Impr. de d'Aubusson y Kugelmann, 1858–1859.
- Saco, José Antonio (1982). José Antonio Saco: acerca de la esclavitud y su historia. Editorial de Ciencias Sociales.
- José Antonio Saco (1830). Memoria sobre caminos, en la isla de Cuba. Impr. por G.F. Bunce.
- José Antonio Saco (1845). La supresion del tráfico de esclavos Africanos en la isla de Cuba: Examinada con relación a su agricultura y a su seguridad. Imprs. de Panckoucke.
- José Antonio Saco (2001). Eduardo Torres-Cuevas (ed.). Obras, volumen 1. Imagen Contemporánea. ISBN 978-959-7078-22-7.
- José Antonio Saco (1848). Ideas sobre la incorporacion de Cuba en los Estados Unidos. Imprenta de Panckoucke.
- Saco, José Antonio (1853). Vingut, Francisco Javier; Vingut, Gertrude Fairfield (eds.). Obras de don José Antonio Saco. Librería Americana y estranjera de R. Lockwood é hijo.
