= USS Lilian (1863) =

Gunboat of the United States Navy

History

United States
- Laid down: date unknown
- Launched: 1863
- Acquired: 6 September 1864
- Commissioned: 6 October 1864
- Decommissioned: 5 April 1865
- Stricken: 1865 (est.)
- Captured: by Union Navy forces; 24 August 1864
- Fate: Sold, 30 November 1865

General characteristics
- Displacement: 630 tons
- Length: 225 ft 6 in (68.73 m)
- Beam: 26 ft (7.9 m)
- Draught: 8 ft 2 in (2.49 m)
- Propulsion: steam engine; wide side wheel-propelled
- Speed: 14 knots
- Complement: not known
- Armament: one 90-pounder gun; one 20-pounder gun
- Armour: iron

USS Lilian was a large steamer captured by the Union Navy during the American Civil War. She was used by the Navy to patrol navigable waterways of the Confederacy to prevent the South from trading with other countries.

== Captured by the Union and commissioned as a Union Navy vessel ==
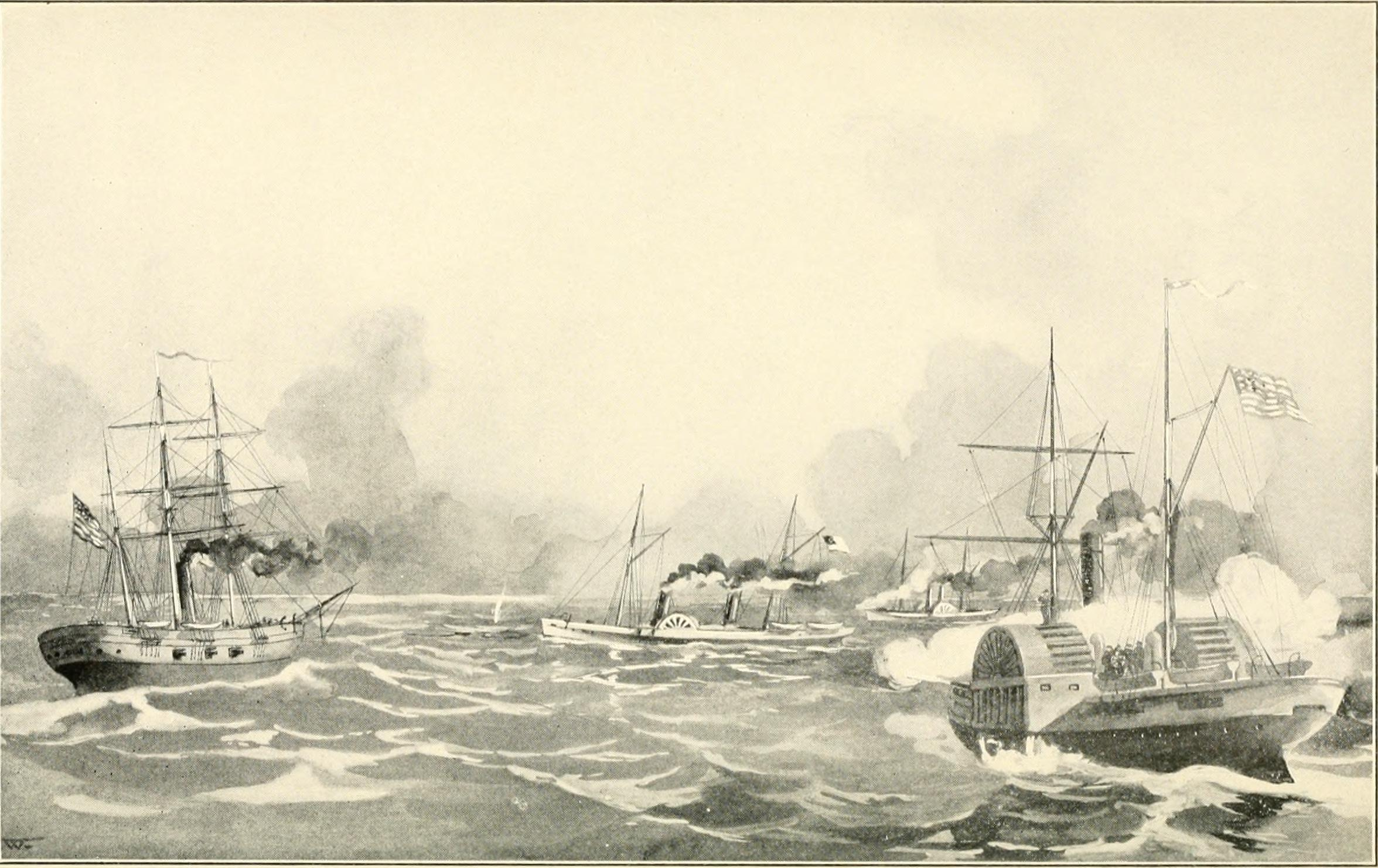
The chase of the Lilian, 24 August 1864

Lilian, an iron wide-wheel steamer built on the Clyde River, Scotland, in 1863, was captured some 100 miles east of Cape Fear, North Carolina, 24 August 1864 by USS Keystone State and other Union ships. Among the prisoners were five Wilmington, North Carolina, pilots being carried to Bermuda to guide Confederate ships through the blockade. Purchased by the Navy from the Philadelphia, Pennsylvania, Prize Court 6 September 1864, she was commissioned 6 October at the Philadelphia Navy Yard, Acting Volunteer Lt. T. A. Harris in command.

== Assigned to join the Union fleet attacking Fort Fisher ==
Lilian joined the fleet attacking Fort Fisher, Cape Fear River, 23 to 24 December 1864 and 13 to 14 January 1865. She landed troops above the fort on the 13th, and then bombarded it. After this attack, she patrolled the inlet, and with USS Tristram Shandy captured the British steamer Blenheim 25 January.

== Post-war decommissioning, sale, and civilian career ==
She decommissioned 5 April 1865 and was sold at public auction at New York City 30 November 1865. Documented 8 October 1866, Lilian operated in merchant service until 1868.
