= Camagüey Cathedral =

Our Lady of Candelaria Cathedral
- Catedral de Nuestra Señora de la Candelaria
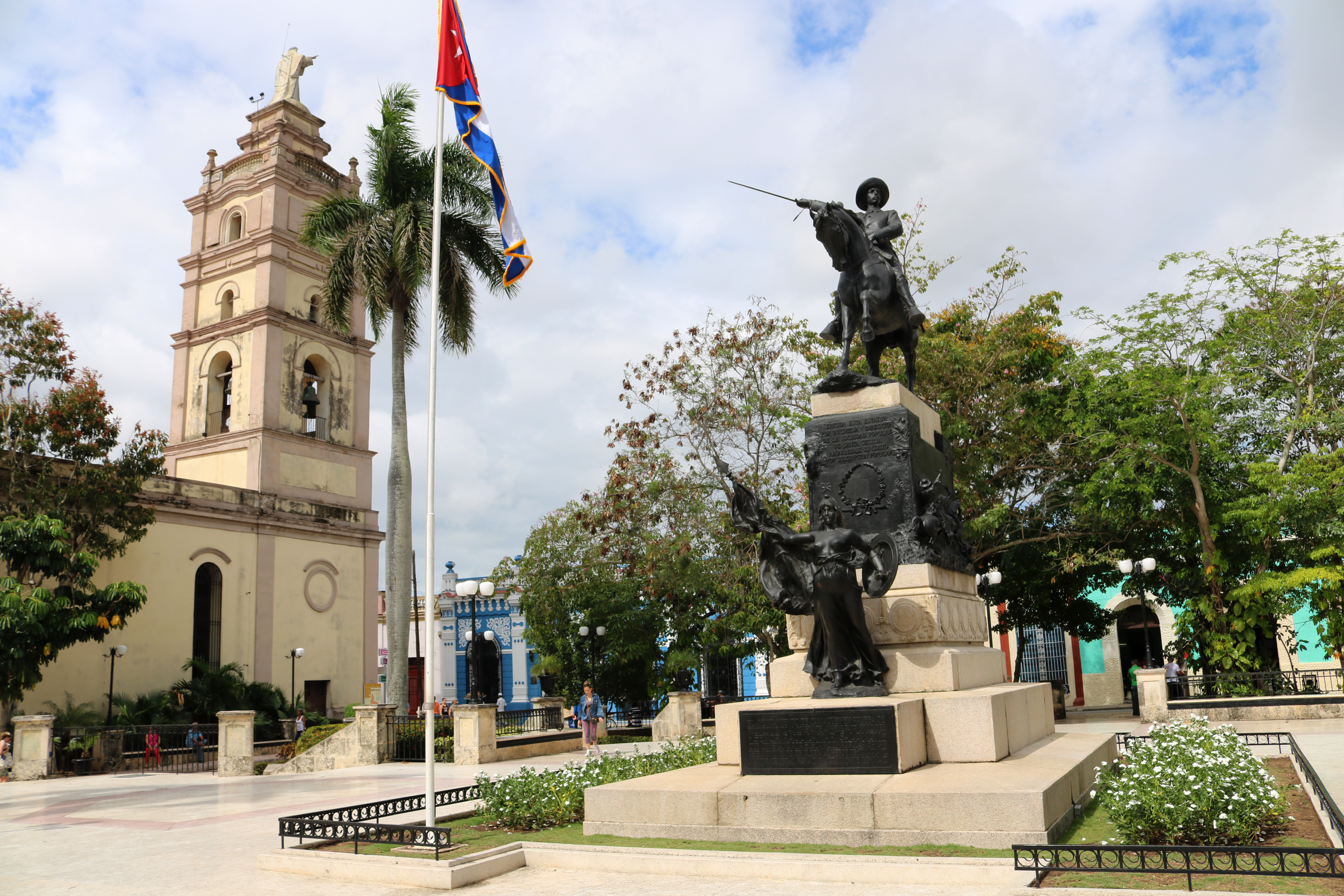

- Location within Cuba
- 21.3783°N 77.9181°W
- Location: Camagüey
- Country: Cuba
- Denomination: Roman Catholic Church

Our Lady of Candelaria Cathedral, (Spanish: Catedral de Nuestra Señora de la Candelaria) also called Camagüey Cathedral, is a Roman Catholic cathedral and minor basilica in Camagüey, Cuba, located in Ignacio Agramonte Park.

== History ==
The building was built in the early eighteenth century, but has been rebuilt several times. The completion of the facade is the result of work done in 1864. After Pope John Paul II visited Cuba in 1998, several donations for the restoration of the cathedral were performed, which today is in very good condition.

The church is dedicated to the patron saint of the city, the Virgen de la Candelaria. The most striking feature is the huge bell tower, topped with a statue of Christ.

The temple follows the Roman or Latin rite and is the seat of the Metropolitan Archdiocese of Camagüey (Archidioecesis Camagueyensis) which was raised to its current status in 1998 by the bull "Maiori spirituali".

The cathedral is part of the historic center of Camagüey, a UNESCO World Heritage Site since 2008. In January 2014 Pope Francis also conferred on it the title of minor basilica.

== See also ==
- Roman Catholicism in Cuba
- Our Lady of Candelaria Cathedral
