= Francisco Dionisio Vives =

Spanish general, ambassador and governor

Francisco Dionisio Vives Piñón (1755–1840) was a Spanish general, ambassador to the United States, and governor of Cuba.

== Life ==
Vives was born in Orán, Salta. He was Captain General of Cuba during 1823–1832, when all Spanish possessions on the American continent had become independent. He had then but few troops under his command, but managed to maintain order and preserve the island of Cuba for Spain without troubles or any sort of violence. In recognition of his valuable services to the mother country, the government rewarded him with high honors, among them the title of Count of Cuba.

== Military life ==
In the early 1800s, when Spain and France had a joint treaty, Vives was commander of the first infantry of Catalonia. He fought in Etruria against Germany under the leadership of General Brunn (1807). When Napoleon made his brother as king of Spain, the Spanish troops who were in Europe heard of the unrest of the nation in regards to the new king. Francisco Vives and his men reached Denmark and boarded British vessels arriving in Santander, Spain, in 1808.

In 1823, King Fernando VII named Vives captain general of Cuba. He served for nine years, in which he was able to lead, showing qualities of high moral character, courage, generosity, and honor (subjective; need citation). He did away with the secessionist conspiracies of "Suns and Rays of Bolivar" and of "black Eagle" (1829). Vives also favored the expansion of the sugar industry and liberalized the foreign trade, creating a great economic growth. He protected the slave trade. He improved public health by opening new hospitals for women, children and mental health patients. On May 15, 1832, he was replaced and named captain general of Valencia (1834-1836), and awarded with the title of a nobleman of his majesty the king of Spain.

Francisco Dionisio Vives married Dona Francisca Candelaria Oliva in Trinidad, Cuba. He fathered a daughter, which he left behind with his wife with the promise to return a retired general. He arrived in Spain and disappeared soon after, unable to ever see his wife and daughter Juana Vives. In letters sent to Segovia, Vives' wife urges the ministry of war to search for her lost husband.

Recorded history shows that an order of search was put out by the constitutional king of Spain, Don Alfonso XII, on January 1, 1881, in order to award Vives with an award according to the military order of San Germenegildo. Vives's daughter married Juan Ferrer and had seven children. They named one of the boys after the General "Francisco"(Paco) Ferrer.
