= Guantánamo Bay =

Bay in Guantánamo Province, Cuba

- Bahía de Guantánamo (Spanish)
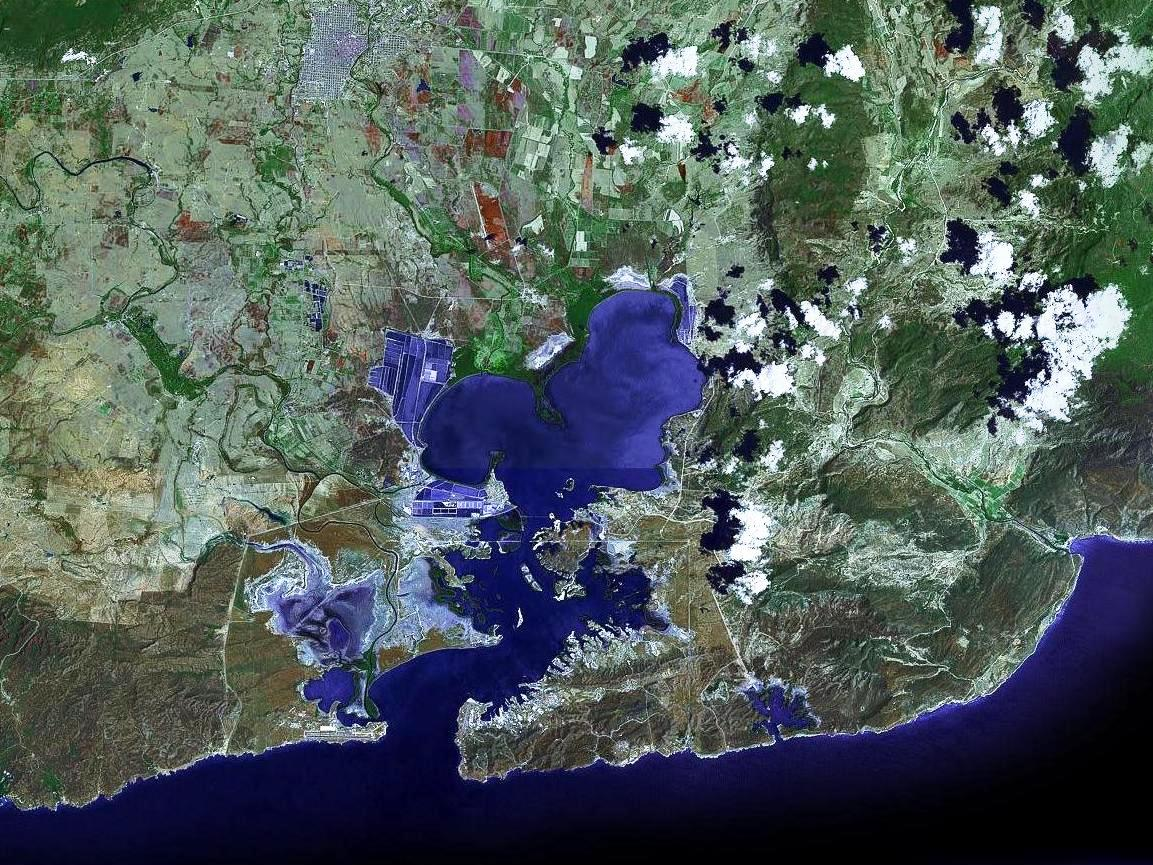
- Guantánamo Bay from satellite

- Location in Cuba
- Location: Caribbean
- Coordinates: 19.997520°N 75.142021°W
- Type: Bay
- Part of: Caribbean Sea
- Basin countries: Cuba; United States
- Islands: Island of Cuba

Guantánamo Bay (Spanish: Bahía de Guantánamo, [baˈia ðe ɣwãnˈtanamo]) is a bay in Guantánamo Province at the southeastern end of Cuba. It is the largest harbor on the south side of the island and it is surrounded by steep hills which create an enclave that is cut off from its immediate hinterland.

The United States assumed territorial control over the southern portion of Guantánamo Bay under the 1903 Lease. The United States exercises jurisdiction and control over this territory as the home of Guantanamo Bay Naval Base, while recognizing that Cuba retains ultimate sovereignty.

== Climate ==
Guantánamo Bay has a hot semi-arid climate according to the Köppen climate classification, with high temperatures throughout the year. Rainfall is rather low, and it is one of the driest regions in Cuba.

Climate data for Guantánamo Bay
Month	Jan	Feb	Mar	Apr	May	Jun	Jul	Aug	Sep	Oct	Nov	Dec	Year
Record high °C (°F)	35 (95)	35 (95)	33 (91)	35 (95)	37 (99)	37 (99)	39 (102)	37 (99)	37 (99)	38 (100)	39 (102)	35 (95)	39 (102)
Mean daily maximum °C (°F)	29 (85)	29 (85)	30 (86)	31 (87)	31 (88)	32 (90)	33 (91)	33 (92)	33 (91)	32 (89)	31 (88)	30 (86)	31 (88)
Mean daily minimum °C (°F)	20 (68)	20 (68)	21 (70)	22 (72)	23 (74)	24 (76)	24 (76)	24 (76)	24 (76)	24 (75)	23 (73)	21 (70)	23 (73)
Record low °C (°F)	13 (55)	13 (55)	16 (61)	17 (63)	18 (64)	20 (68)	21 (70)	20 (68)	19 (66)	18 (64)	16 (61)	13 (55)	13 (55)
Average precipitation mm (inches)	25 (1.0)	23 (0.9)	30 (1.2)	33 (1.3)	91 (3.6)	53 (2.1)	28 (1.1)	48 (1.9)	76 (3.0)	130 (5.1)	46 (1.8)	28 (1.1)	610 (24.0)
Source: Weatherbase

== U.S. control of Guantánamo Bay ==
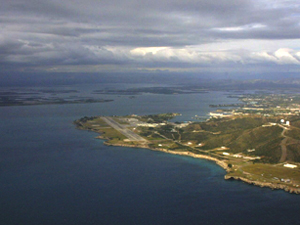
Aerial view of Guantánamo Bay

The United States first seized Guantánamo Bay and established a naval base there in 1898 during the Spanish–American War in the Battle of Guantánamo Bay. In 1903, the United States and Cuba signed a lease granting the United States permission to use the land as a coaling and naval station. The lease satisfied the Platt Amendment, passed by the United States Congress, which stated that:

. . . to enable the United States to maintain the independence of Cuba, and to protect the people thereof, as well as for its own defense, the government of Cuba will sell or lease to the United States lands necessary for coaling or naval stations at certain specified points to be agreed upon with the President of the United States.

== History ==
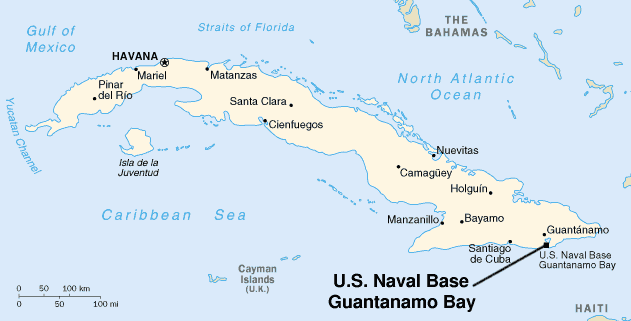
Map of Cuba with location of Guantánamo Bay indicated

The original inhabitants of the bay, the Taínos, called it Guantánamo. Christopher Columbus landed in 1494, naming it Puerto Grande. On landing, Columbus' crew found Taíno fishermen preparing a feast for the local chieftain. When Spanish settlers took control of Cuba, the bay became a vital harbor on the island's south side.

The bay was briefly renamed as "Cumberland Bay" when a British expeditionary force captured it in 1741 during the War of Jenkins' Ear. British Admiral, Edward Vernon, arrived with a force of eight warships and 4,000 soldiers with plans to march on Santiago de Cuba. However, a small Cuban guerilla force prevented the British from advancing, forcing Vernon to withdraw. British forces attempted a second assault on Santiago in 1748 but they were unsuccessful. In late 1760, two Royal Navy frigates, HMS Trent and HMS Boreas cut out the French privateers Vainquer and Mackau, which were hiding in the bay. The French were also forced to burn the Guespe, another privateer, to prevent her capture.

During the Spanish–American War of 1898, the U.S. Navy fleet attacking Santiago needed shelter from the summer hurricane season. They chose Guantánamo because of its excellent harbor. U.S. Marines landed with naval support in the invasion of Guantánamo Bay in June 1898. As they moved inland, however, Spanish resistance increased, and the Marines required support from Cuban scouts.

Guantanamo Bay is of interest to U.S. military planners due to its geographical location in the Caribbean. It became a strategic location in defending the Panama Canal and the southern US coast. It was also a natural haven for naval vessels in the region. Due to other factors, it pushed the US to consider the area as a suitable location for a Naval Base.

Guantanamo Bay Naval Base surrounds the southern portion of the bay.

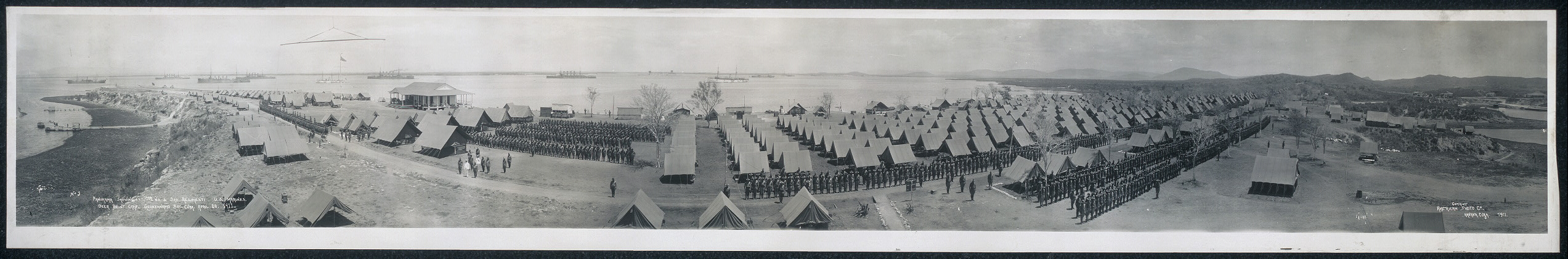
The U.S. Marines 1st, 2nd & 3rd Regiments at Deer Point Camp, Guantánamo Bay, Cuba, April 26, 1911

The naval base, nicknamed "GTMO" or "Gitmo", covers 116 square kilometres (45 sq mi) on the western and eastern banks of the bay. It was established in 1898, when the United States took control of Cuba from Spain following the Spanish–American War. The newly-formed American protectorate incorporated the Platt Amendment in the 1901 Cuban Constitution. Tomás Estrada Palma, the first president of Cuba, offered a perpetual lease for the area around Guantánamo Bay on February 23, 1903. The 1903 Cuban–American Treaty of Relations held, among other things, that the United States, to operate coaling and naval stations, has "complete jurisdiction and control" of the Guantánamo Bay, while recognizing that the Republic of Cuba retains ultimate sovereignty.

In 1934, a new Cuban-American Treaty of Relations, reaffirming the lease, granted Cuba and its trading partners free access through the bay, modified the lease payment from $2,000 in U.S. gold coins per year to the 1934 equivalent value of $4,085 in U.S. dollars, and made the lease permanent unless both governments agreed to break it, or until the U.S. abandoned the base property.

After the Cuban Revolution of 1953–1959, United States president Dwight D. Eisenhower insisted that the status of the base remain unchanged, despite the objections of Fidel Castro. Since then, the Cuban government has cashed only one of the rent cheques from the U.S. government, and even then, according to Castro, only because of "confusion" in the early days of the Cuban revolution. The remaining uncashed cheques, made out to "Treasurer General of the Republic" (a title that ceased to exist after the revolution), were kept in Castro's office, stuffed into a desk drawer.

In the 1990s, the United States used Guantanamo Bay as a processing center for asylum-seekers and as a camp for HIV-positive refugees. Over a period of six months, the US interned over 30,000 Haitian refugees in Guantanamo, while another 30,000 fled to the Dominican Republic. Eventually, the US admitted 10,747 of the Haitians to refugee status in the United States. Most of the refugees were housed in a tent city on the re-purposed airstrip that would later be used to house the complex used for the Guantanamo military commissions. The refugees who represented discipline or security problems were held on the site that later became Camp XRay, the initial site of the Guantanamo Bay detention camp. In August 1994, rioting broke out in the detention camps and 20 U.S. military police and 45 Haitians were injured.

Since 2002, the base has included detention of individuals deemed of risk to United States national security. In 2009, the U.S. president, Barack Obama, gave orders for the detention camp to close by January 22, 2010. But by the end of his presidency, it remained open due to a congressional refusal of funds for its closure. Eric Lewis (Chairman of Reprieve US and legal representative for Guantanamo detainees) writes that as of 2026, fifteen men remain at Guantanamo to this day. Nine have been charged in military commissions; two have been convicted, one at trial and one through a plea.

Alfred-Maurice de Zayas has argued that the 1903 lease agreement was imposed on Cuba under duress and was a treaty between unequals, no longer compatible with modern international law, and voidable ex nunc. He makes six suggestions for a peaceful settlement, including following the procedure outlined in the Vienna Convention on the Law of Treaties. However, Article 4 of the Vienna Convention states that its provisions do not apply to past treaties retroactively.

In January 2025, U.S. president Donald Trump, said the US would send to and detain migrants in the base, resuming a practice that the US had employed at Guantanamo Bay previously over decades for migrants intercepted at sea.

== See also ==
- Cuba–United States relations
- Guantanamo Bay detention camp
- Platt Amendment: Document to guarantee U.S. Navy lease in Cuba
