= Cuban–American Treaty of Relations =

Cuban–American Treaty of Relations may refer to:

- Cuban–American Treaty of Relations (1903)
- Cuban–American Treaty of Relations (1934)
