= Economy of Republic of Cuba (1902–1959) =

From the time the island of Cuba gained independence to the Cuban Revolution, (between 1902 and 1959), the economy of Cuba was characterized by the significant influence of its large neighbor to the north, the United States (the largest city in the state of Florida -- Miami -- being only about 230 miles from Cuba's capital Havana). U.S. fruit companies like the United Fruit Company, which controlled large agricultural estates, were especially dominant and played a major role in the sugar and fruit export sectors. The U.S. investment extended to the tourism industry, with American entrepreneurs developing hotels and casinos, particularly in Havana, making tourism a major economic driver. This period also saw political instability and the rise of organized crime, which impacted the tourism sector. The Cuban Revolution of 1959 led to the nationalization of industries and the cessation of economic ties with the United States, drastically altering Cuba's economic landscape.

== International tourism ==
Between 1902 and 1959, Cuba emerged as a premier tourist destination in the Caribbean, attracting significant numbers of American visitors due to its proximity, vibrant nightlife, and lack of Prohibition-era restrictions. Following Cuba's independence from Spain in 1902, both the Cuban government and American entrepreneurs invested heavily in the country's tourism infrastructure, leading to the development of luxury hotels, casinos, and entertainment venues, particularly in Havana. The establishment of direct shipping routes from the United States further facilitated this growth.

Casino gambling began in Cuba in the 1920s and took off in the 1950s. Casino minimum betting requirements and dress code meant its customers were overwhelmingly foreign tourists and not Cubans. Sex work also catered to tourists. By the end of the 1950s there were an estimated 270 brothels and 11,500 women making a living as sex workers in Havana. The notoriety and visibility from the concentration in certain districts of Havana (Colón, San Isidro, Pajarito street, etc.) attracted much attention from foreign tourists, the number of workers was not remarkable compared to equivalent areas in the tourists' countries, considering the number of tourist customers and the poverty and unemployment of Cuba.

During the 1930s, despite the Great Depression, Cuba's tourism industry continued to thrive, bolstered by American tourists seeking leisure activities where alcohol consumption was legal. This period saw the opening of iconic establishments such as the Hotel Nacional de Cuba, which became a magnet for wealthy tourists and celebrities.

The post-World War II era marked a period of dramatic expansion for Cuban tourism, driven by the increasing accessibility of air travel and continued American interest. The Cuban government promoted the island as an exotic yet convenient destination, and by the 1950s, tourism had become a cornerstone of the Cuban economy.

However, the rise of organized crime and significant American mafia influence in Havana's casinos and hotels began to tarnish Cuba's image. Political instability and corruption further exacerbated these issues. The Cuban Revolution of 1959, led by Fidel Castro, resulted in the nationalization of many industries, including tourism, and a severing of ties with the United States, leading to a sharp decline in U.S. visitors and a reconfiguration of Cuba's tourism landscape.

== Foreign investment ==
American investment in Cuba during this time was particularly notable, driven by factors such as geographical proximity, economic interests, and political relations. The United States emerged as a key investor in Cuba, with investments flowing into industries such as sugar, mining, tourism, and transportation.

Infrastructure development received considerable investment during this period, with projects ranging from the construction of railways and ports to the development of urban centers and utilities. U.S. companies often spearheaded these initiatives, aiming to enhance Cuba's transportation networks and facilitate the movement of goods and people.

The banking and financial sector witnessed significant investment, with U.S. banks establishing branches in Cuba and providing capital for various economic activities. These investments helped fuel economic growth and development, contributing to Cuba's emergence as a key player in the global economy.

However, alongside the economic benefits, American investment in Cuba also brought about political and social complexities. The close economic ties between Cuba and the United States led to increased American influence in Cuban affairs, shaping government policies and decision-making processes.

== Agriculture ==
Cuba's agricultural economy centered primarily on the sugar industry, serving as the cornerstone of the nation's exports. U.S. influence, particularly from companies like the United Fruit Company, was pervasive, with significant investments in large-scale sugar plantations and the production and export of sugar and tropical fruits to the United States. This period underscored Cuba's role as a key supplier of raw agricultural commodities, heavily reliant on the fluctuating prices and demands of the U.S. market, which contributed to economic volatility.

The expansion of sugar plantations in the early 20th century, facilitated by U.S. capital, brought about modernized agricultural practices and infrastructure. The Platt Amendment further solidified American economic dominance by allowing substantial intervention in Cuban affairs. By the 1920s, Cuba earned the moniker "Sugar Bowl of the World," with sugar comprising the majority of its exports. However, the economic boom was punctuated by periods of downturn, highlighting the risks associated with dependence on a single crop.

In addition to sugar, U.S. enterprises such as the United Fruit Company invested in cultivating bananas and other tropical fruits. These endeavors were characterized by large estates employing thousands of Cuban workers under harsh conditions, contributing to a dual economy in the agricultural sector, juxtaposing modern, mechanized plantations with subsistence farming by local peasants.

Challenges intensified during the 1930s and 1940s due to the Great Depression and subsequent U.S. economic policies, which hindered efforts to diversify agriculture and reduce reliance on sugar. Despite attempts at agrarian reforms, notably influenced by U.S. economic interests, the Cuban government faced significant hurdles in implementation.

The 1950s witnessed escalating political instability, culminating in the Cuban Revolution of 1959. Led by Fidel Castro, the revolutionary government nationalized all foreign-owned estates, including those of the United Fruit Company. Land redistribution aimed to address economic disparities and diminish foreign influence, with agrarian reform laws targeting the breakup of large plantations and the redistribution of land to peasant families and cooperatives. This transformative period fundamentally altered the structure of Cuban agriculture, ushering in a new era marked by significant socio-economic changes.

== Manufacturing industry ==
=== Textiles and clothing Industry ===
The textiles and clothing industry in Cuba from 1902 to 1959 played a significant role in the nation's industrial development. This sector, centered primarily in Havana and other urban areas, experienced growth facilitated by both local entrepreneurship and foreign investment. The production of textiles and garments was aimed at reducing the country's reliance on imported goods and fostering domestic economic growth.

The early 20th century saw the establishment of numerous textile factories in Cuba, producing a variety of fabrics, including cotton and linen, which were then used to manufacture clothing and other textile products. These factories incorporated modern machinery and production techniques, often funded by foreign capital, particularly from American and European investors.

The textiles and clothing industry provided employment to thousands of Cubans, contributing to urbanization and the development of a skilled workforce. The sector supported ancillary industries, including dyeing, printing, and garment manufacturing, creating a comprehensive textile production ecosystem. Products from this industry were not only consumed domestically but also exported, enhancing Cuba's economic profile.

=== Construction materials Industry ===
The construction materials industry in Cuba from 1902 to 1959 was a crucial component of the nation's industrial sector, driven by the demand for infrastructure development. This industry included the production of cement, bricks, tiles, and other construction materials, essential for both urban and rural development.

Significant investments were made in the construction materials industry to support the growing needs of urbanization and industrialization. The development of modern production facilities for cement and bricks was a priority, with substantial contributions from foreign investors, particularly American companies. These investments ensured the availability of high-quality construction materials necessary for building roads, bridges, residential buildings, and industrial facilities.

The construction materials industry played a pivotal role in Cuba's economic growth by providing essential materials for infrastructure projects. It supported employment for a large segment of the population, including skilled laborers and factory workers. The production of construction materials also stimulated related sectors, such as mining for raw materials and transportation for distribution.

== Impact of corruption ==
Political corruption was widespread, with multiple administrations marred by scandals and misuse of public funds. Presidents and officials frequently engaged in corrupt practices like accepting bribes and embezzling money, undermining public trust and contributing to political instability.

Economically, corruption led to inefficiencies and stifled competition. Government contracts were often awarded based on favoritism, and public funds intended for infrastructure, healthcare, and education were frequently misappropriated. The sugar industry, central to Cuba's economy, was not immune, with officials colluding with industry leaders to manipulate prices and production quotas.

Socially, corruption increased inequality and social injustice, as resources and opportunities were often distributed based on connections rather than merit. This fostered resentment among the population, particularly among the lower and middle classes, and deteriorated public services.

Corruption also facilitated foreign influence, particularly from the United States. American businesses often engaged in corrupt dealings with Cuban officials to secure favorable conditions, further entrenching U.S. economic dominance and exacerbating Cuba's dependency on foreign capital.

Efforts to combat corruption were often met with limited success. Reform-minded politicians and activists sought to address corruption through legal reforms and public awareness initiatives, but these were frequently undermined by entrenched interests.

== Employment ==
=== Women ===
As of 1953 (when the last census before the revolution was taken), 87,522 women in Cuba were employed as domestic servants, 77,500 women worked for a relative for no pay. Only 14% of women worked year-round, approximately 83% of all employed women worked less than ten weeks a year, and 21,000 women were unemployed and seeking work.
