= Eric Lewis =

Eric Lewis may refer to:

- Eric Lewis (pianist) (born 1973), American jazz pianist
- Eric Lewis (actor) (1855–1935), British actor
- Eric Lewis (rugby league) (1909–1959), Australian rugby league footballer
- Eric Lewis (basketball) (born 1971), American basketball referee
- Eric Lewis (human rights attorney), Human Rights Attorney
