= José Lacret Morlot =

Cuban revolutionary soldier and politician

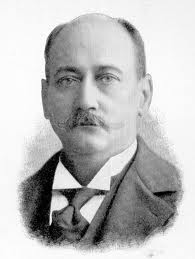

Last President of the Republic of Cuba in Arms
- In office April 4, 1899 – June 30, 1899

Personal details
- Born: October 26, 1850 El Cobre, Cuba
- Died: December 24, 1904 (Aged 54) Havana
- Resting place: Necropolis Cristóbal Colón
- Awards: Monument (Bust decapitated by vandals in 2022)

Military service
- Branch/service: Cuban Liberation Army
- Rank: Division General
- Battles/wars: Ten Years' War; Little War (POW); Cuban War of Independence

José Lacret Morlot (October 26, 1850 – December 24, 1904) was a Cuban revolutionary soldier, military leader, and politician, notable for his participation in both of Cuba's wars of independence against Spain. A descendant of a French family, Lacret became one of the most prominent advocates for Cuban independence and the abolition of slavery. His personal motto was: "Everything for Cuba!" (Spanish: Todo por Cuba!)

The street connecting the present-day neighborhoods of Diez de Octubre and Cerro is named in his honor. Lacret's monument, a white marble bust, was decapitated by vandals in 2022. The Concord Bridge on the Yumurí River in Matanzas was originally named after Lacret.

== Early life ==
Lacret was born in Santiago de Cuba, Oriente Province—possibly on a family estate in Hongolosongo, 21 km from the city of El Cobre, Cuba. He was the son of Pedro Alejandro Lacraite León and Micaela Mourlot Deame, owners of three prosperous coffee plantations whose produce was exported to France. Lacret received his early and secondary education in Santiago de Cuba and later studied in France. Despite the opportunities abroad, he remained deeply attached to his homeland and its cause for freedom.

== Ten Years' War ==
Lacret joined the Cuban insurrection at the outbreak of the Ten Years’ War in 1868, serving under Major General Donato Mármol. He was wounded in the Battle of El Cobre on November 23, 1868, captured by Spanish forces, and later released. He continued to support the revolutionary cause, serving as prefect of Guanimao in the Sierra Maestra, where he encountered the deposed President Carlos Manuel de Céspedes.

As Antonio Maceo's assistant, Lacret participated in the Battle of Juan Mulato and in the famous Protest of Baraguá. He accompanied Maceo to Jamaica in May 1878 to seek support for continuing the war and later returned to Cuba with a message to President Manuel de Jesús Calvar.

== Little War ==
Though he supported the failed Little War, Lacret was arrested in October 1879 and imprisoned in both Cuba and Spain until his release in June 1880.

== Cuban War of Independence ==
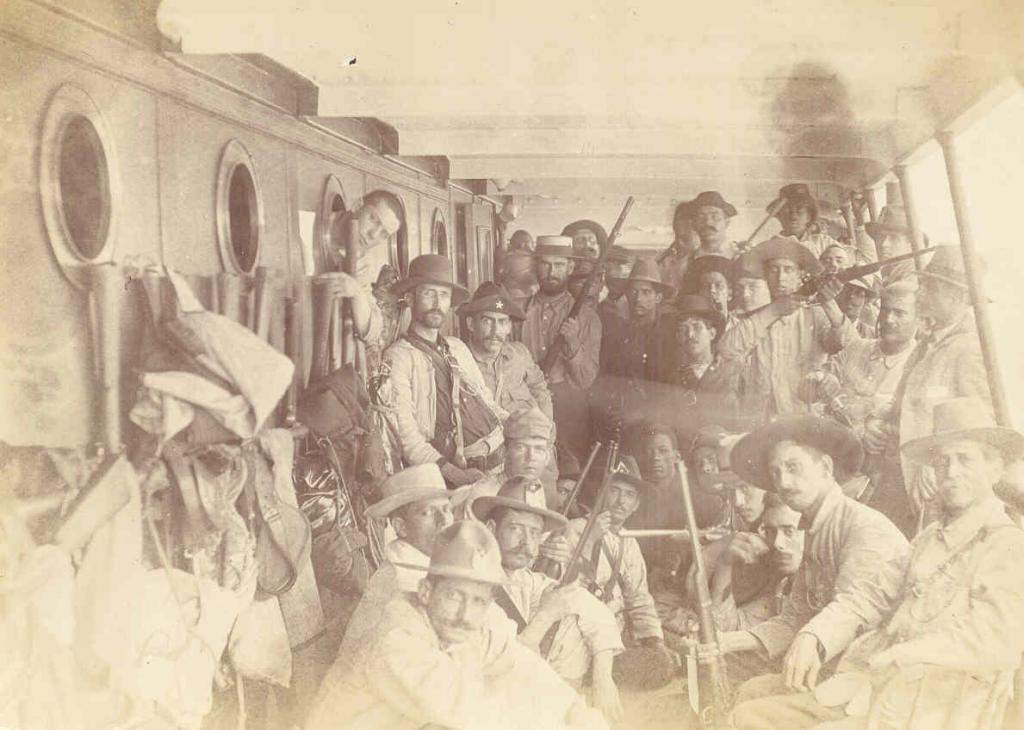
Photograph of the expedition led by General José Lacret Morlot of the Liberation Army, aboard the Plant Line steamship Florida, which landed in Banes, Holguín, on May 26, 1898.

Lacret rejoined the independence struggle on July 15, 1895, in Sagua la Grande, Las Villas Province. He organized revolutionary forces and operated in the provinces of Las Villas and Matanzas. On December 18, 1895, he was appointed head of the Matanzas province by Maceo. He led over 183 combat actions, including battles at Quita Pesares, Lagunillas, and Hato de Jicarita, and was instrumental in the destruction of Spanish sugar mills.

Despite his success, General Máximo Gómez removed him from his position in January 1897, citing discipline issues. He later joined the General Headquarters and was elected vice president (and subsequently president) of the Constituent Assembly of La Yaya in October 1897. Lacret was also involved in a proposed but ultimately blocked expedition to Puerto Rico.

In May 1898, with U.S. support, he led an expedition from Tampa to Banes, Oriente, to reinforce Cuban efforts in the final stages of the war.

== Ranks ==
- Captain (February 18, 1874)
- Colonel (July 15, 1895)
- Brigadier General (December 18, 1895)
- Division General (March 10, 1896)

== Postwar contributions and political career ==
Lacret chaired the Executive Commission of the Assembly of Representatives of the Cuban Revolution (ARRC) until its dissolution in June 1899. He was one of nine Cuban generals invited to the official power-transfer ceremony on January 1, 1899. He founded La Marina Cubana, a newspaper promoting the Cuban merchant navy, and was elected to the 1901 Constituent Assembly, where he opposed the Platt Amendment.

== Later life and death ==
A staunch nationalist, Lacret opposed foreign control by the United States and supported national development projects, including the revitalization of the Cuban navy, industrial initiatives, and the dredging of the Cauto River.

He died in poverty and isolation in Havana on December 24, 1904.
