= Rafael Portuondo Tamayo =

Cuban revolutionary soldier and prominent Cuban politician

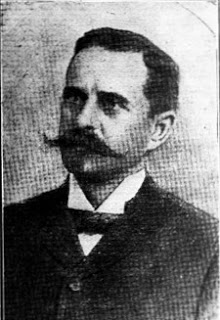

11th President of the Republic of Cuba in Arms
- In office 10 November 1898 – 4 April 1899

Secretary of Foreign Affairs for the Republic of Cuba in Arms
- In office October 1895 – October 1897
- President: Salvador Cisneros Betancourt
- Preceded by: Ramón de Céspedes

Representative of the Congress of Cuba
- In office 1902–1908
- Constituency: Oriente Province

Personal details
- Born: 21 March 1867 Santiago de Cuba
- Died: 15 July 1908 (aged 41) Mayarí
- Resting place: Santa Ifigenia Cemetery

Military service
- Rank: Division General
- Battles/wars: Cuban War of Independence

Rafael María Portuondo Tamayo was a Cuban lawyer, revolutionary, and military officer who played a significant role during the Cuban War of Independence (1895–1898). Portuondo was closely associated with the eastern theater of the war and was an early supporter of the Cuban Revolutionary Party, founded by José Martí.

== Early life and revolutionary activity ==
In 1890, at the age of 23, Portuondo participated in the Peace of Manganeso conspiracy, an unsuccessful plot tied to a visit by General Antonio Maceo. By 1893, Martí had appointed him as the Delegate of the PRC in Santiago de Cuba, making him a central figure in organizing the civilian resistance in Oriente Province, working in conjunction with General Guillermo Moncada.

== Cuban War of Independence ==
On 24 February 1895, Portuondo joined the insurrection in Alto Songo, coordinating with Moncada to launch the uprising in Oriente. He initially fought under Colonel Victoriano Garzón in early engagements, including actions in Ramón de las Yaguas, Arroyo Hondo, El Cristo, and Jobito.

He was appointed Auditor of the Eastern Department on 1 June 1895, and later that year became Secretary of Foreign Affairs in the provisional Cuban Government Council led by Salvador Cisneros Betancourt.

He represented the First Army Corps at the Jimaguayú Constitutional Assembly ( 13–18 September 1895), where he supported the centralization of military and executive authority.

He also accompanied General Antonio Maceo's invasion column during the First Eastern Campaign from Baraguá to Sancti Spíritus between October and December of that year.

In 1896, Portuondo led a successful expedition of 67 men aboard the Three Friends steamer, landing at Baconao Bay on 30 May. That same year, he proposed the creation of diplomatic representation abroad, leading to the establishment of the Department of Expeditions. He briefly served as interim Minister of War and was later named Inspector of the Eastern Department by General Calixto García.

He participated in the final operations of the war, including the siege of Santiago de Cuba in 1898, and was formally demobilized in April 1899.

== Military ranks ==
- Captain (24 February 1895)
- Commander (29 June 1895)
- Lieutenant Colonel (14 September 1895)
- Colonel (30 May 1896)
- Brigadier General (19 December 1897)
- Division General (2 August 1898)

== Postwar public service and political career ==
Following the war, Portuondo served as a prosecutor in the judicial districts of Oriente and Camagüey. He was a delegate to the Assembly of Representatives of the Cuban Revolution and chaired its Executive Commission. As a member of the Cuban Constituent Assembly of 1901, he notably voted against the Platt Amendment, which allowed U.S. intervention in Cuban affairs.

Between 1902 and 1908, he represented the province of Oriente in the Cuban Chamber of Representatives.

On 24 February 1907, he delivered the keynote speech at the reburial ceremony of José Martí in Santiago de Cuba, where Martí was honored with the rank of Major General.

== Death ==
Rafael María Portuondo Tamayo was assassinated by stabbing on 15 July 1908, in Mayarí, Oriente Province, reportedly by an individual suffering from mental illness. In 1927, a monument (20.022982779584286°N 75.82956823076198°W) was erected in his honor.
