= Partido Independiente de Color =

Defunct Cuban political party of former slaves

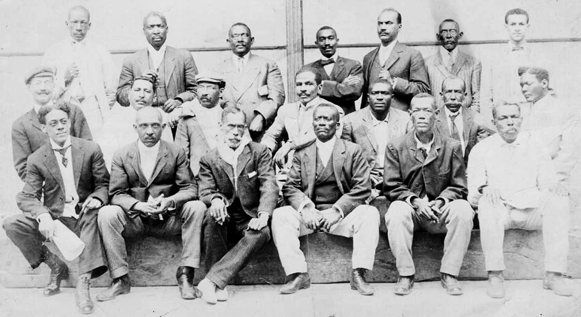
Leaders of the party

The Partido Independiente de Color (PIC) was a Cuban political party composed almost entirely of African former slaves. It was founded in 1908 by African veterans of the Cuban War of Independence. In 1912, the PIC led a revolt in the eastern province of Oriente. The revolt was crushed and the party disbanded. It is believed Esteban Montejo, subject of Miguel Barnet's "Biografía de un cimarrón," was a member of this party, or had close associates who were.

== Background ==
The Cuban War of Independence was a conflict between Cuban Revolutionaries and Spain that lasted from 1895 to 1898. The United States intervened in 1898 on the side of the Cuban revolutionaries as a part of the Spanish–American War. At the end of the war, Cuba became a US protectorate. During the war, Spain frequently painted the conflict as a "race war" and referred to Cuban revolutionary troops as "blacks". A majority of the troops in the Cuban independence army were black and mixed-race, while the majority of the senior officers in the Cuban independence army were white. After the war, the United States ordered the independence army disbanded.

== The early PIC ==
The Partido Independiente de Color (PIC) in Cuba was founded on August 7, 1908, by black and mixed-race veterans of the Cuban War of Independence in response to the mistreatment they received at the hands of the government. The party was created in the aftermath of the August 1, 1908 local and municipal elections in which no black politician was elected to office. As a consequence, black Cubans considered it necessary to establish a political party composed entirely of Black Cubans, as they were excluded from the other parties' candidate lists.

The party advocated for equal treatment under the law regardless of race. Its platform included free university education, free immigration regardless of race, guaranteed public employment, and distribution of land to veterans of the War of Independence.

The PIC was the first group in Cuban political discourse to make reference to the racial composition of the Independence army. The PIC holds the distinction of being the first black political party in the western hemisphere. This is significant in view of the number of African Americans who were politically active at the time in the United States and elsewhere. Alin Helg would suggest that this is because Black people would conform to the white multi-party system and support a candidate that didn't have elitist views. By this logic, the PIC was a radical new idea that involved building a new independent party. This had not been tried before due to the risk involved.

The Afro-Cubans were experiencing problems of land restructuring. Since the war for independence, United States businesses had been quietly taking up the land in the Oriente. This was on the far eastern side of the island, where most Afro Cubans lived and worked. The peasant land was taken over by Americans people business, which caused a dramatic shift in the standards of living. With more of their land being taken by US companies the Afro Cubans were becoming disenfranchised.

== The ideas of José Martí ==
José Martí was a martyr for Cuban Independence. He believed that all Cubans should concentrate on being Cuban regardless of race, ethnicity, or creed. Martí thought that the only way for Cubans to retain their sovereignty was through nationalism. He believed in presenting a strong unified front to oppose Spain colony influence in Cuba. The issue for the PIC was that they felt like they were being left out of this nationalist view. This presented the separation of worldviews between the PIC and Cuban Nationals with regards to the teachings of Martí. The federal Cuban government stated that they needed to conform to the nationalist dream as the government described it.

== Further conflict ==
The PIC, upon its formation, took votes away from the ruling liberal party. It also stirred up such a conflict that President José Miguel Gómez was forced to take action. Gomez ordered the party disbanded under the Morúa law which outlawed political parties based on race. The Morúa law was aimed at creating the illusion of Cuban nationalism while favoring the Spanish Cubans. The Cuban Spanish supremacist social construct was meant to repress the Afro Cubans. In some ways it was successful by keeping the Afro Cubans from holding political office. The Afro Cubans also found ways to use the system to their advantage. They used the nationalist system to acquire education claiming that if there was no race division in Cuba they should be able to earn a degree just like any other Cuban. This mindset allowed the Afro Cubans to use nationalism, which many Spanish Cubans used to exclude and oppress them, to their advantage.

== The Platt Amendment ==
The Platt Amendment was used by the PIC much the same way they used the social constructs described by Alejandro de la Fuente. When the Morúa law was passed the party leaders sent a petition to Washington DC. The PIC wished to invoke the third article of the Platt Amendment. The third article of the Platt Amendment states that the US will protect the life, property, and individual liberty of citizens of Cuba. This plea for US help shows the PIC again being willing to call upon constructs not necessarily meant for them. The petition to President Taft asked: “to accept our most solemn protest in the name of the Independent Party of Color against outrages against our persons and our rights by the armed forces of the Cuban Government”. By calling upon the Platt Amendment the PIC was trying to do to the US government what they did to the Cuban Universities. They appealed to the idealistic words that the United States had put on paper to collect on these values. The United States did not accept the plea of the PIC.

== The uprising of 1912 ==
This cartoon, titled "A Current Sport," appeared in the newspaper La Discusión on June 8, 1912, and alludes to the cooperation between the United States and white Cubans in suppressing the Black movement. A U.S. sailor and a white Cuban soldier are playing soccer with the heads of Estenoz and Ivonnet, leaders of the Independent Party of Color. The caption reads: "Is this how 'football' will be played in Oriente?"

By 1912, the PIC's attempts at reform of the existing system had been ended and they had been effectively expelled from the political arena. The movement was no longer able to express their views through the existing political system. In addition, their appeal for support under article II of the Platt Amendment had also been rejected by the US government. As a result of political disenfranchisement, protests were mobilized through Oriente province and Cuba more generally. These protests and the disruption to the socioeconomic status quo were depicted through racially charged ways in newspapers such as El Día which described the protest and the broader movement which it represented as:

a racist uprising, an uprising of blacks, in other words, an enormous danger… Such uprisings are moved by hatred, and their purpose is negative, perverse; they are only conceived by something as black as hatred. They do not try to win but to hurt, to destroy, to harm, and they do not have any purpose. And they follow the natural bent of all armed people without aim and driven by atavistic, brutal instincts and passions: they devote themselves to robbery, pillage, murder, and rape. These are, in all parts and latitudes of the world, the characteristics of race struggles.

— El Día, May 26, 1912

Evaristo Estenoz began preparing for a rebellion. On 20 May, they attacked the Cuban Army. Fighting occurred mainly in Oriente Province, where most Afro-Cubans lived. There were also an outbreak of violence in the west, particularly in Las Villas Province. The rebel movement was met with severe repression from the Cuban government who appealed to the US government for support to quell the unrest under the Platt amendment and received support from US marines, who moved to protect US owned property, railroads, trains, and mines. The rebels only attacked the marines once. President Gómez offered amnesty to any of the rebels who surrendered by 22 June, but Estenoz continued to fight with a few hundred men. Estenoz was killed by government forces on 27 June. Rebel forces had numbered at least 3,000 men, but by June there were only an estimated 1,800 left alive, although some sources cite as many as 6,000 total deaths including civilians.

Photo of the crowd at the burial of Pedro Ivonnet, Cuba, 1912.

Pedro Ivonnet, a leader of the PIC, characterized the PIC's exclusion from the political sphere as “the epilogue of the trial of la Escalera.” According to him, the outbreak of violence in 1912 was yet another event in a much longer struggle between free blacks and the state in Cuba. The two sides of this debate, the reformers who sought to reform the existing system and the revolutionaries who wanted to entirely reshape the landscape can both be seen in the post-independence period. With the reformers having already failed, the rebellion of 1912 represented the revolutionary wing's attempt to influence and reshape the landscape, but the violence it was met with prevented them from achieving their goals.

== Aftermath ==
The Cuban Race War was short lived but the repression in the aftermath was brutal. Many Afro-Cubans were killed whether or not they were involved in the struggle. This military action goes to show just how much race relations had deteriorated in Cuba. It also signified the instability of the revolutionary government.
