= 1908 Cuban local and provincial elections =

Local and provincial election held in Cuba

Local and provincial elections were held in Cuba on August 1, 1908. The elections took place during the Second American Occupation of Cuba and was intended by the Americans to allow for a withdrawal of U.S. troops and restoration of Cuban self-government.

The National Conservative Party was considered to have performed unexpectedly well in the elections, as they won three out of six governorships and 28 mayoralties. No black candidates were elected to office in the elections, which prompted the creation of the Partido Independiente de Color on August 7, 1908.
