= Juan Gualberto Gómez =

Afro-Cuban revolutionary leader in the Cuban War of Independence

Juan Gualberto Gómez Ferrer
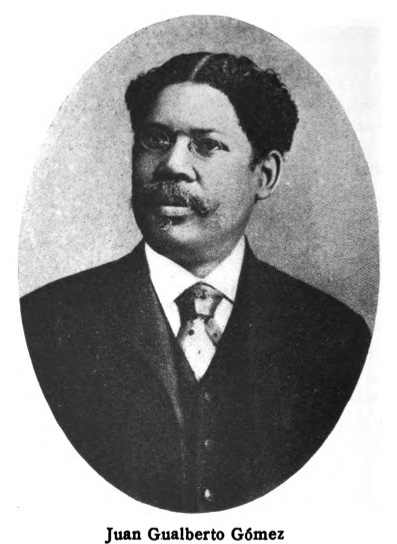
- Juan Gualberto Gómez as a Senator in 1919
- Born: July 12, 1854; Matanzas, Spanish Cuba
- Died: March 5, 1933 (aged 78); Havana, Cuba

Juan Gualberto Gómez Ferrer (July 12, 1854 – March 5, 1933) was a Cuban revolutionary leader in the Cuban War of Independence against Spain. He was a "close collaborator of [José] Martí's," and alongside him helped plan the uprising and unite the island's black population behind the rebellion. He was an activist for independence and a journalist who worked on and later founded several pivotal anti-royalist and pro-racial equality newspapers. He authored numerous works on liberty and racial justice in Latin America as well.

In his later years, he was a "journalist-politician." He defended the revolution against racism and U.S. imperialism and upheld Martí's legacy in print (often under the pseudonym "G") as he served the Cuban state; he was a part of the Committee of Consultations that drafted and amended the Constitution of 1901, and was a representative and senator in the Cuban legislature. He is best remembered as "the most conspicuous" Cuban activist leader of the 1890s independence struggle and "one of the revolution's great ideologues."

== Early life and travels ==
Gómez was born on the hacienda "Golden Fleece," a sugar plantation owned by Catalina Gómez. His parents, Fermin Gómez (Yeye) and Serafina Ferrer (Fina) were African slaves but managed to buy the freedom of their child, Juan, before birth, in accordance to the law of the time. His status as a free man allowed him to learn to read and write. Because of his literacy skills, rare for Afro-Cubans growing up on plantations in this era of chattel slavery, his parents sent him to school at Nuestra Señora de los Desamparados, in (English: Our Lady of the Forsaken) in Havana, despite the financial sacrifice it meant.

In 1868, the Ten Years' War broke out. A climate of violence and intimidation prevailed, and after the young Gómez got caught up in a brawl between royalists and independence groups at the Teatro Villanueva, his parents decided to send him to France—with financial help from plantation owner Catalina Gómez—to study the craft of building horse carriages, one of the few trades open to blacks and mestizos in the colonial period. His successes as an apprentice led him to study at engineering school.

In July 1872, Francisco Vicente Aguilera and Gen. Manuel de Quesada arrived in Paris to raise funds for Cuban independence. Needing a translator, Gómez was hired, making his first professional connection. But the political situation in France became more difficult, following the defeat of the Second French Empire in the Franco-Prussian War and subsequent violence of the proletarian "Paris Commune" amid the rocky founding of the Third French Republic, and soon he faced a difficult economic situation as well. In 1874, his parents experienced economic hardships and informed Gómez they couldn't continue to finance his stay in Paris and advised him to return to Cuba. Gómez, not wanting to return, found low-paying jobs at newspapers as a reporter. Eventually, he suspended his studies to work as a journalist in the Revue et Gazette des Theatres, which was the beginning of his journalistic career.

Initially out of financial necessity, then political convictions, Gómez wrote news items and editorials, eventually engaging directly in politics. By 1877, his political personality was solidly formed as a journalist, debater, and public speaker. In 1878, he went to Mexico where he met the abolitionist Nicolas Azcarate, a Cuban exile, and learned of the defeat of the independence forces in Cuba and the end of the Ten Years' War with the Pact of Zanjón. Given the new political situation, many exiles returned to Cuba and Gómez made the move home, going back to Havana in late 1878.

== The independence struggle ==
Once back in Havana, Gómez met José Martí in 1878, beginning a long friendship founded on shared ideals that united the revolutionary action of both. In that year, he and Martí began conspiring together in preparation for a new uprising; both men were appointed secretary of various revolutionary groups in Havana. Also In 1879, Gómez started the pro-racial justice newspaper The Brotherhood, but its publication was interrupted when he was deported to Spain along with other plotters of the Little War. After arriving in Spain, he spent ten years in Madrid, and wrote for many publications, including Tribuna, El Pueblo, El Progreso–each organs of the Spanish republican movement, and other journals, such as Abolitionism.

After Juan Gualberto Gómez returned to Cuba in 1890, Martí hatched the plot for the opening moves of the revolt and assigned Gómez his deputy to prepare for the upcoming uprising in the La Habana province (which was significantly larger then) and he was able to orchestrate the war preparations right under the noses of the relatively unconcerned Spanish authorities. Martí gave the order for armed uprising on February 24, 1895, and Gómez helped lead the failed uprising of Ibarra, Matanzas. Initial attempts at insurrection fell flat, "mainly because the call to revolution received no immediate, spontaneous support from the masses." The rebellion had yet to gain much momentum in early 1895. "The Province of Puerto Principe, for example, remained so quiet that the Spanish waited until June to declare martial law there."

On February 28, Spanish forces captured Gómez. He was sentenced to 20 years imprisonment in the dungeons of Ceuta and Valencia but only spent three years in prison. After being released, Gómez moved to New York City where he continued to work with fellow revolutionaries. In December 1898, he accompanied Major General Calixto García to Washington, D.C. as a member of the commission sent to negotiate for the funds necessary for the Cuban Liberation Army and recognition of the rebels.

During the second U.S. military intervention (1906–1909) he was a member of the Committee of Consultations, the Advisory Committee charged with amending the Cuban constitution, and a prominent speaker for the anti-U.S. faction. He famously said, "the Platt Amendment has reduced the independence and sovereignty of the Cuban Republic to a myth." He held seats in the Cuban House of Representatives (1914–1917) and Senate (1917–1925), from the province of Havana. He always campaigned to defend Afro-Cubans from discrimination, oppression, and violence.

== Fighting for racial equality ==
Throughout the Ten Years' War, and after, "Spain sought, with considerable success, to divide Cubans along racial lines by portraying itself as the defender of white 'civilization'" against blacks who would plunge Cuba into a Haiti-type slave revolt and "Africanize" the island if not suppressed. Colonial authorities fanned the flames of racial fear so widely that the United States, under President Franklin Pierce, threatened to intervene (See also: Ostend Manifesto). Since his formative years were spent involved in, then fleeing from, the Ten Years' War, Juan Gualberto knew that one of the most important issues that Cubans had to resolve in order to unite and earn their independence from Spain was the problem of racism on the island. It was not enough to have abolished slavery, pro-independence groups also must abolish prejudice and conspicuous public discrimination if they wanted to unite Afro-Cubans behind the cause of independence.

Upon his 1877 return to Havana, Juan Gualberto began his life as a grassroots activist in earnest, fighting not only for Cuban independence, but racial equality. In April 1879, his newspaper The Brotherhood debuted with the banner "General Journal for the defense of the colored race in Cuba." Through The Brotherhood he presented examples and pleas against the abuses and discrimination suffered by blacks and mulattos. In one 1888 article, it reminded its readers that "yesterday we were slaves, today we are free, we want to participate in life, claim our rights, we want consideration and respect." The Brotherhood reported on living conditions: the main concerns and worries of the black population; even publishing the letters of people of color who wrote in about their misfortunes and experiences. The Brotherhood won Juan Gualberto more followers across the island; as he was recognized as Cuba's first true spokesman and defender of black people.

Juan Gualberto was also a prominent advocate for black veterans of the War of Independence, and fought for them to get public benefits and recognition. The experience of combat service in Cuba's founding war for independence offered Afro-Cubans "a new and distinct form of claiming the rights of citizenship." Through the advocacy of groups like the "Committee of Veterans and Association of the Colored Race," black veterans of the Cuban Liberation Army, decorated war heroes and inconspicuous rank and file troops alike, invoked their status as freedom fighters and citizen-soldiers in demanding voting rights, anti-discrimination measures, and civil service jobs in the new government. Defending the Committee of Veterans, Juan Gualberto urged opponents to yield to their demands for compensation and just treatment, "so that we do not forget the sacrifices of the petitioners in the very recent revolutionary past, a time when skin color was of no importance, but quality and individual virtues were of great importance."

"Gómez had become the most notable Afro-Cuban leader in the island by the 1890s, when he presided over the Directorio Central de Sociedades de la Raza de Color (Central Directorate of Societies of the Colored Race) and began publishing the newspaper La Igualidad." The Central Directorate, which brought together roughly 100 black organizations, waged a successful civil rights campaign, gaining Spanish colonial edicts "outlawing restrictions on interracial marriage" as well as ending government segregation of schools and other public facilities. The Central Directorate's pivotal role in the fight for racial equality is "widely acknowledged," and it also gained Afro-Cuban activists important organizational and political experience, tools that facilitated black political involvement and influence for a generation. Unfortunately, edicts from Spanish authorities on the island ending state-sponsored segregation had little real impact, with many towns and villages only opening public parks to blacks in subdivided "separate but equal" areas, and numerous businesses and storefronts were still labeled "whites only." "As a result, most politically active Afro-Cubans remained committed" to breaking away from the Spanish government. When the third war for independence erupted in 1895, the bulk of the activist groups under the Directorate's umbrella shut their doors, their members having taken up arms for the revolution and left their communities.

Even after Cuban independence was secured, however, anti-discrimination progress was more symbolic than real, and pressure grew to start an independent political party for Afro-Cubans. Juan Gualberto was always opposed to the formation of a black party, a position he held throughout his political life, despite this stance becoming increasingly controversial. On this issue he was severely criticized and lost popularity among fellow Afro-Cubans, especially in the years following independence.

After the first years of the republic passed with nothing done to promote integration or end discrimination, and the August elections of 1908 closed and not one "black candidate from the two traditional political parties was elected to office," political discontent among blacks and mulattos peaked. "Following years of agitation and political upsets, it was clear that black Cubans could not depend on the existing party apparatus. As a result, prominent Afro-Cubans banded together to form the first black political party in Cuba, the Partido Independiente de Color (PIC)," or Independent Colored Party, without Gómez.

"Juan Gualberto Gómez and Martín Morúa Delgado, the two most prominent black Cuban congressmen at the time, opposed the movement from the beginning and used Cuba’s supposed history of racial harmony as a justification to put down the Independientes." Most established Cuban politicians of Juan Gualberto's era, both black and white, opposed the development of the PIC, anxious that it would "erode some of their power and popular base" and upset the balance they had spent years building.

== Advocacy in the early days of the republic ==
After Cuba was declared a republic May 20, 1901, Juan Gualberto Gómez, writing under the pseudonym "G," was a skillful fighter against Tomás Estrada Palma, Cuba's first president, and the Platt Amendment, which he thought turned Cuba into almost a colony of the United States. His articles attacking chronic graft and subservient, pro-annexation politicians kneeling before U.S. power and influence highlighted the righteousness of those who stayed true to José Martí's legacy.

== Death ==
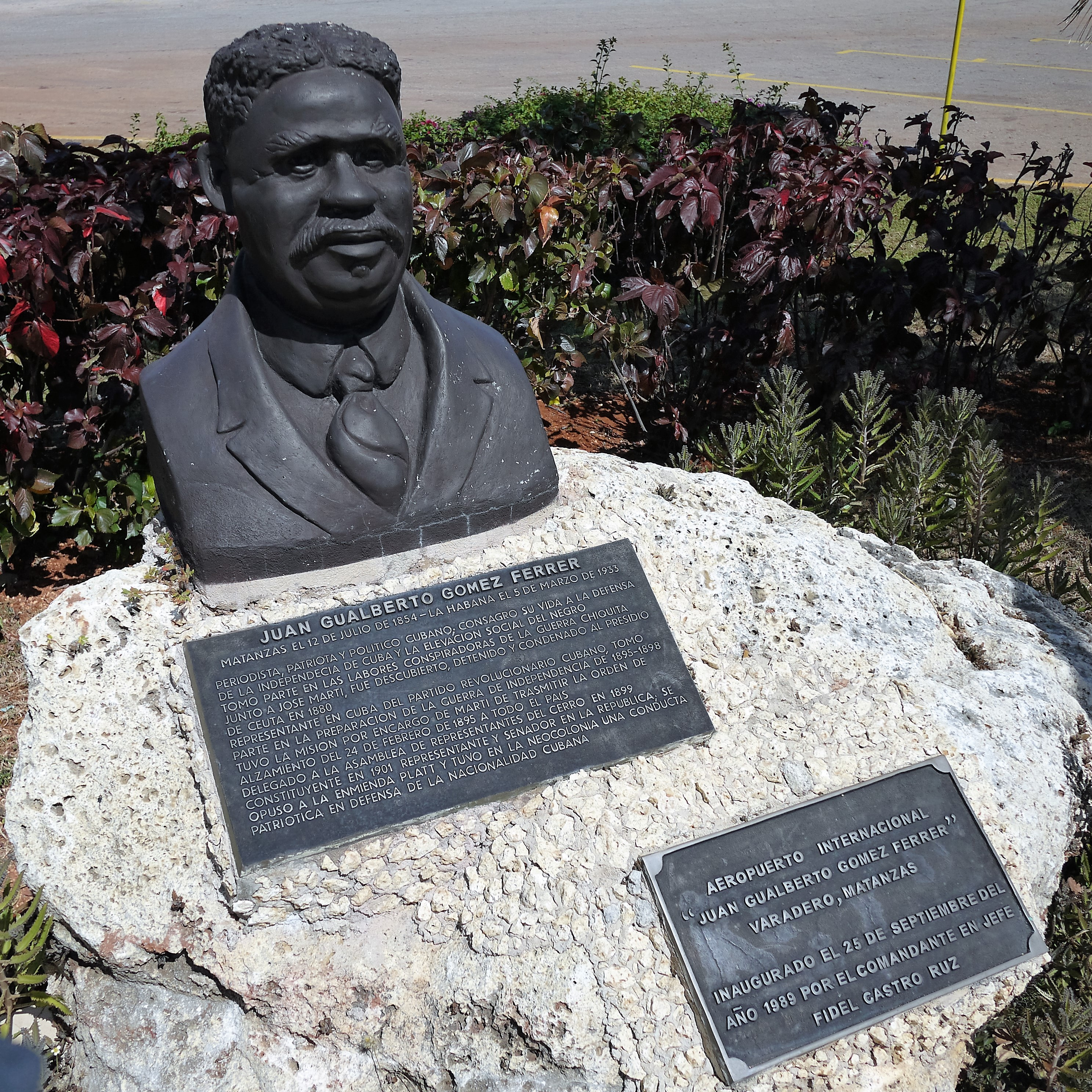
Bust of Juan Gualberto Gómez at the Juan Gualberto Gómez Airport.

Juan Gualberto Gómez died March 5, 1933, at 78 years old. In his honor, the Union of Journalists of Cuba established the annual prize that bears his name.

The Varadero international airport (VRA) is named the Juan Gualberto Gómez Airport in his honor.

== Bibliography ==
Juan Gualberto Gómez authored numerous Spanish-language works on liberty, racial justice and independence in Latin America, including:

- The Cuban Question in 1884 (1885)
- The Marianas and Caroline Islands (1885)
- The Island of Puerto Rico (1891)
