= War of 1912 =

1912 protests and uprisings in Cuba

Coordinates: 20.300°N 76.078°W

- Part of Banana Wars
- This cartoon, titled "A Current Sport," appeared in the newspaper La Discusión on June 8, 1912, and alludes to the cooperation between the United States and White Cubans in suppressing the Black movement. A U.S. sailor and a White Cuban soldier are playing soccer with the heads of Estenoz and Ivonnet, leaders of the Independent Party of Color. The caption reads: "Is this how 'football' will be played in Oriente?"
| Date | 20 May 1912 – 18 July 1912 (1 month and 28 days) |
| Location | Cuba |
| Result | Rebellion suppressed Dissolution of the Partido Independiente de Color (PIC) |

Belligerents
| Cuba; United States | (Cuba) Cuban Partido Independiente de Color |

Commanders and leaders
| (Cuba) José Miguel Gómez (United States) Lincoln Karmany | (Cuba) Evaristo Estenoz † (Cuba) Pedro Ivonnet † |

Casualties and losses
| Unknown | 3,000–6,000 killed |

The War of 1912 (Spanish: Levantamiento Armado de los Independientes de Color, lit. 'Armed Uprising of the Independents of Color'), also known as the Little Race War or The Twelve, was a series of protests and uprisings in 1912 in Cuba. The conflict was between Afro-Cuban rebels and the armed forces of Cuba, taking place mainly in the eastern region of the island where most Afro-Cubans lived and worked.

After weeks of fighting involving massacres of Afro-Cubans by the Cuban National Army under the command of General Jesus Monteagudo and a U.S. military intervention to protect American corporate interests, the rebellion was put down. The leaders of the Afro-Cuban rebels, Evaristo Estenoz and Pedro Ivonnet, were killed during the rebellion and their political movement, the Independent Party of Color, was dissolved. Between 3,000 and 6,000 people were killed in the rebellion.

== Background ==
=== Social conditions ===
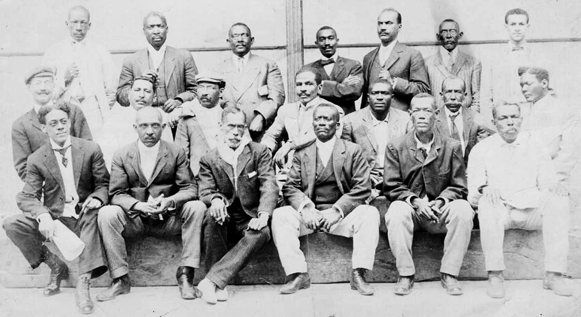
Leaders of the Independent Party of Color, composed almost entirely of African former slaves

Conditions in Cuba were poor for the Afro-Cubans, most of whom worked in the sugarcane industry. In 1895 during the war for independence from Spain, Evaristo Estenoz began a movement to better these conditions. Veterans of that war, primarily the officers, organized the Independent Party of Color in 1908. Under the leadership of Estenoz, the party quickly gained the support of a large number of Afro-Cubans in opposition to Cuban President José Miguel Gómez. Gómez ordered the party disbanded under the Morúa law, which outlawed political parties based on race. By 1912 the Independent Party of Color had regrouped to stage another rebellion.

=== US Marines in Cuba ===
In early 1912, the United States government sent a detachment of 688 US Marines, consisting of officers and enlisted men, to Guantanamo Bay Naval Base because Estenoz and his followers were preparing a rebellion. The rebels numbered several hundred men, mainly peasants, and were lightly armed.

== History ==
=== Beginning ===
On 20 May, Estenoz and the rebels under his command confronted the Cuban Army. Fighting took place mainly in the Oriente Province, where most of the Afro-Cubans lived. A few minor outbreaks of violence took place in the west, particularly in Las Villas Province. Initially, the rebels were successful in engaging the Cuban government forces, which included regular soldiers, Guardia Rural (mounted police) and volunteer militia.

On 23 May, President Gómez requested aid from U.S. President William H. Taft, who sent additional marines. The first reinforcements arrived on 28 May, landing at Deer Point, Guantanamo Bay, in order to join the U.S. battalion already in Cuba. Colonel Lincoln Karmany was in command of this new force, designated the 1st Provisional Regiment of Marines. It numbered 32 officers and 777 enlisted men.

=== Cuban official response ===
The Cuban government and the Cuban press responded to the uprising with a racist demonization of the rebels. The Cuban president called on the Cuban people to fight for "civilization" against "ferocious savagery". The President also invoked the image of a "raped teacher" which turned out to be misinformation put forth by a conservative newspaper. The conservative newspaper "El Dia" argued that Cuba should copy the Jim Crow Laws in the United States where "blacks are mistreated and society is segregated" concluding that "dominated races do submit". Afro-Cuban politicians became worried and angered over the escalation of racism during the rebellion. The racial demagoguery motivated Juan Gualberto Gomez, a former Cuban independence leader, to publish a manifesto condemning the racial demonization.

=== Arrival of United States forces ===
The 2nd Provisional Regiment of the United States Marines with 1,292 officers and enlisted men under Colonel James E. Mahoney was also sent to Cuba. Most of the regiment arrived at the Guantanamo Bay Naval Station on 7 June, while one battalion landed at Havana on 10 June. The USS Mississippi landed her detachment at El Cuero on 19 June. Of the 1,292 US soldiers who landed at Guantanamo, only one battalion was deployed for combat duty. Colonel Karmany had command of all the unassigned troops. All together, the American forces in Cuba totaled 2,789 officers and enlisted men, and the forces were organized into the 1st Provisional Marine Brigade.

About half of the American brigade was sent to occupy towns and cities in eastern Cuba. The rest remained at the naval base. In June Estenoz rapidly began losing control of the rebel-occupied territory to the Cuban military, which was successful in dispersing large bands of the rebels and bystanders. Rebel forces had once numbered at least 3,000 men, but by June there were an estimated 1,800 remaining alive, although some sources cite 6,000 rebel deaths in total in the brief conflict.

=== Suppression ===
The United States Marines were assigned to protect the American copper mines, railroads and trains. The Afro-Cuban rebels attacked the Marines only once, at El Cuero, but were repulsed without casualties on either side.

President Gómez offered amnesty to any of the rebels who surrendered by 22 June, but Estenoz continued to fight with a few hundred men, even though most of the rebels surrendered. By the end of June, the majority of the rebels had returned to their homes, abandoning the rebellion. Estenoz was killed by government forces who shot him in the back of the head at Miraca on 27 June.

Photo of the crowd at the burial of Pedro Ivonnet, Cuba, 1912.

Estenoz's death splintered the rebel army into small factions which were soon defeated. The most important faction was that of Pedro Ivonnet, who led his forces into the forests and mountains to wage a guerrilla war. However, he was driven out by the middle of July. Ivonnet surrendered on July 18, 1912, but was killed, reportedly while "trying to escape".

== Aftermath ==
Following Ivonnet's surrender, Gómez announced that the United States Marines were no longer needed. The Marines then began to withdraw, first to the naval base at Guantanamo and then to military bases in the United States. The last Marines to leave Cuba embarked on the USS Prairie on 2 August. The Afro-Cubans suffered between 3,000 and 6,000 casualties, both combatants and non-combatants, and the results of the rebellion were disastrous. The Independent Party of Color was dissolved and conditions in Cuba remained unchanged.

== Notes ==
- Aline Helg, Our Rightful Share: The Afro-Cuban Struggle for Equality, 1886–1912 ( University of North Carolina Press, 1995)
- Pérez Louis A., "Politics, Peasants, and People of Color: The 1912 “Race War” in Cuba Reconsidered", Hispanic American Historical Review, 66 (3),1986, 509–539. doi: https://doi.org/10.1215/00182168-66.3.509
