= Cuban–American Treaty of Relations (1903) =

1903 treaty between Cuba and the United States

Treaty of relations
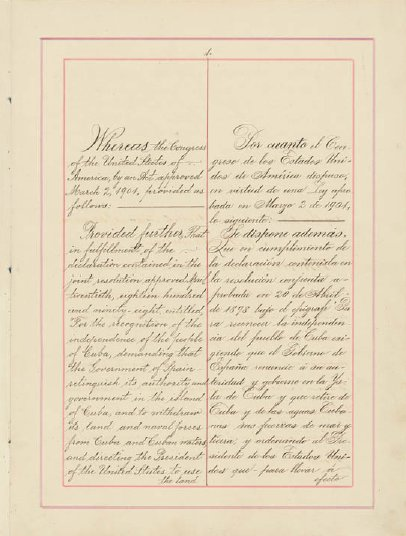
- Page one of the 1903 Treaty of Relations, including the Platt Amendment
- Signed: May 22, 1903
- Location: Havana
- Effective: July 1, 1904
- Expiry: June 9, 1934
- Signatories: Cuba; United States
- Citations: 33 Stat. 2248; TS 437; 6 Bevans 1116
- Also known as the Permanent Treaty (6 Bevans 1126). Amended by supplementary convention of January 20, 1903 (TS 438; 6 Bevans 1123). Abrogated by the Treaty of Relations of 1934 on June 9, 1934 (TS 866; 6 Bevans 1161).

The 1903 Cuban–American Treaty of Relations (Spanish: Tratado cubano–estadounidense or Tratado cubano–americano) was a treaty between the Republic of Cuba and the United States signed on May 22, 1903. The treaty contemplated leases of Guantánamo Bay; one such lease had been executed earlier in the year in February 1903, and a second lease was executed later in the year in July 1903.

== The 1903 Treaty of Relations ==
U.S. law directed the president to cede control of Cuba to its government only when that government had endorsed the seven provisions established in U.S. law by the Platt Amendment of March 1901. The 1903 Treaty of Relations noted that Cuba's Constitutional Convention had, on June 12, 1901, added the Platt Amendment provisions to its constitution on February 21, 1901. Those provisions, among other things, restricted the independence of the Cuban government and gave the U.S. the right to oversee and at times interfere in Cuban affairs. The Cuban government had taken power and the U.S. withdrawn its forces as of May 20, 1902. The final provision of the Platt Amendment required that its other provisions be adopted by treaty as well. The Treaty of Relations, signed in May 1903, accomplished that.

The 1903 Treaty of Relations was used as justification for the Second Occupation of Cuba from 1906 to 1909. On September 29, 1906, Secretary of War (and future U.S. president) William Howard Taft initiated the Second Occupation of Cuba when he established the Provisional Government of Cuba under the terms of the treaty (Article three), declaring himself Provisional Governor of Cuba. On October 23, 1906, President Roosevelt issued Executive Order 518, ratifying the order.

The 1903 Treaty of Relations was superseded by the 1934 Treaty of Relations, which abrogated in large measure the 1903 treaty while affirming the U.S. right to lease land for a naval station and continuing to hold the U.S. blameless for actions taken before the establishment of the Republic of Cuba in 1902.

== The 1903 lease treaties ==
One lease that accomplished what the treaty contemplated had been executed earlier in the year and a second lease was executed later in the year. The lease treaty agreed to from February 16–23, 1903 stipulates that the Republic of Cuba lease to the United States specific lands in Cuba, notably the land that surrounds Guantánamo Bay, for the purpose of coaling and naval stations, for as long as necessary. The lease stipulates that the United States "shall exercise complete jurisdiction and control", while recognizing "the continuance of the ultimate sovereignty of the Republic of Cuba". Cuban vessels involved in trade will have free passage through the waters. The United States has the right to modify the waters as necessary.

Under the lease treaty signed on July 2, 1903, the U.S. must send $2,000 in gold as payment to the Cuban government each year. After the Gold Reserve Act of 1934 removed the U.S. gold standard, lease payments were unilaterally changed to a cardboard check backed by paper dollars. The payment due on July 2, 1974, was made by check in the amount $4,085. With inflation, $2,000 of 1903 dollars would have been worth about $4,085 in 1934 and would have further increased to over $52,000 by 2013; however the payment remains at $4,085.

Since the Cuban Revolution, the Cuban government has cashed one of these checks, and only because of "confusion" in the early days of the revolution. The other checks, made out to "Treasurer General of the Republic", a position that has not existed since 1959, were once shown stuffed in a desk drawer in Castro's office during a television interview with him.

== American perspectives ==
The treaty fell short of the original desires of both the United States government and its military cabinet in Cuba. The desire was to lease four areas rather than the two: Guantánamo Bay and Bahia Honda. The other two were Cienfuegos, and Nipe Bay.

== Cuban perspectives ==
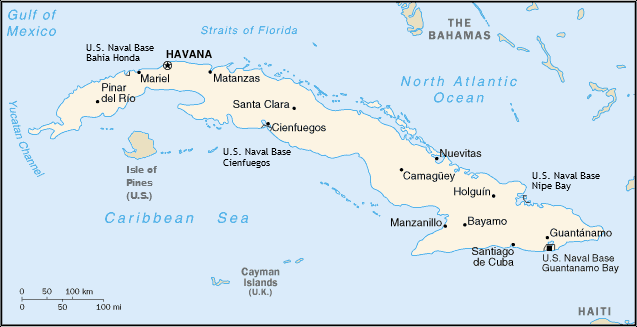

The government of Cuba argues that the base is a constant affront to its sovereignty, taken under duress and maintained under the threat of atomic force. It has complained that weapons are smuggled into Cuba through the base and that the base shelters criminals fleeing from Cuban justice. The lease contains a mutual extradition right to both parties for fleeing criminals.

Cuban-American legal scholar Alfred-Maurice de Zayas argues that the lease may have been invalidated by material or fundamental breaches of its terms. The February 1903 lease, in Article II, states that the United States is allowed "generally to do any and all things necessary to fit the premises for use as coaling or naval stations only, and for no other purpose." He questions whether the prison facility meets those criteria.

== See also ==
- Cuba–United States relations
- 1873 Dominican Republic Samaná Peninsula referendum
