= Miguel Gener =

Cuban politician

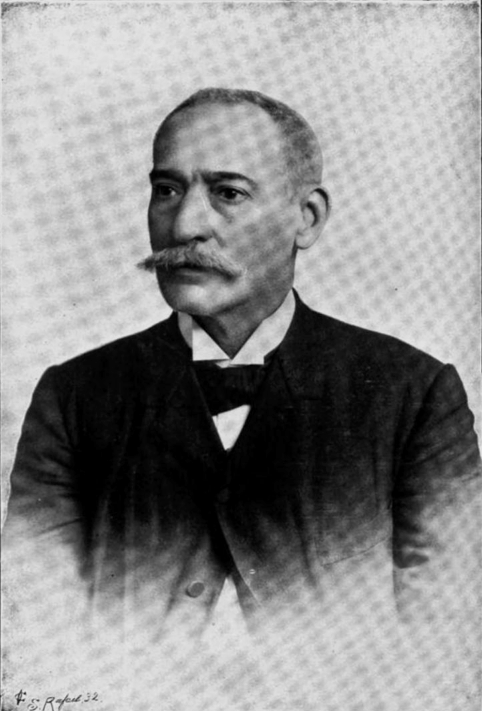

Personal details
- Born: 1841
- Died: May 24, 1905 (aged 63–64)

Miguel Gener y Rincón was a Cuban politician, delegate to the Congress of Cuba, Secretary of Justice during the US military occupation of the island, and Mayor of Havana. At the Cuban Constitutional Convention after the end of the Cuban War of Independence, Gener was the first Cuban politician to introduce the concept of Women's suffrage to the island, but his bill was rejected, and women would not earn the right to vote in Cuba for another three decades. In 1902, pending an investigation by Emilio Núñez, Gener was removed as mayor of Havana by Leonard Wood, after a vote of twenty-three out of twenty-five members of the City Council requested him to do so.
