= Good Neighbor policy =

Franklin Roosevelt policy towards Latin America

- 1933–1945
Big Stick ideology, Dollar diplomacy, and the Roosevelt Corollary	Containment
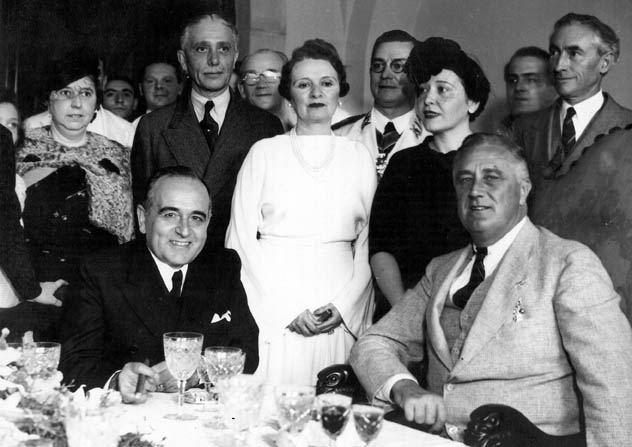
- Brazilian president Getúlio Vargas (left) and US president Franklin D. Roosevelt (right) in 1936
- Duration: 12 years
- Location: The Americas (principally the Western Hemisphere)
- Including: Montevideo Convention (1933) ) Relation to doctrine: Repudiation of the Monroe Doctrine
- President: Franklin D. Roosevelt
- Key events: Inauguration of Franklin D. Roosevelt (1933)

The Good Neighbor policy (Spanish: Política de buena vecindad; Portuguese: Política da Boa Vizinhança) was the foreign policy of the administration of United States president Franklin D. Roosevelt towards Latin America. The policy's main principle was that of non-intervention and non-interference in the domestic affairs of Latin America. It also reinforced the idea that the United States would be a "good neighbor" and engage in reciprocal exchanges with Latin American countries. Overall, the Roosevelt administration expected that this new policy would create new economic opportunities in the form of reciprocal trade agreements and reassert the influence of the United States in Latin America; however, many Latin American governments were not convinced.

Although the policy was implemented by the Roosevelt administration, President Woodrow Wilson had previously used the term, but subsequently went on to justify U.S. involvement in the Mexican Revolution and occupation of Haiti. Senator Henry Clay had coined the term Good Neighbor in the previous century. President Herbert Hoover turned against interventionism and developed policies that Roosevelt continued.

== Background ==
In the early 20th century, the United States periodically intervened militarily in Latin American nations to protect its interests, particularly the commercial interests of the US business community. After the Roosevelt Corollary of 1904, whenever the United States felt its debts were not being repaid in a prompt fashion, its citizens' business interests were being threatened, or its access to natural resources was being impeded, military intervention or threats were often used to coerce the respective government into compliance. This made many Latin Americans wary of U.S. presence in their region and subsequently hostility grew towards the United States.

President Wilson landed U.S. troops in Mexico in 1914, in Haiti in 1915, in the Dominican Republic in 1916, in Mexico a second time in 1916, and in Mexico several additional times before Wilson left office, in Cuba in 1917, and in Panama in 1918. Also, for most of the Wilson administration, the U.S. military occupied Nicaragua, installed a Nicaraguan president that the U.S. preferred, and ensured that the country signed treaties favorable to the U.S.

== Coolidge and Hoover administration ==
During the Coolidge administration, work began in the State Department to compile a comprehensive review of all the instances of state actions done in the name of the Monroe Doctrine. This would be the most comprehensive document of its kind and the task was given to the then Undersecretary J. Reuben Clark. In 1928, his office issued the Clark Memorandum, which importantly separated out the Monroe Doctrine from the Roosevelt Corollary and clarified that not all foreign interventions fall under the Monroe Doctrine.

The memorandum lay dormant until President Herbert Hoover adopted it. Following a policy of non-intervention, Hoover was one of the strongest voices against U.S. occupation as well as an enthusiastic promoter of inter-American relations.

== Roosevelt administration ==
=== Background ===
While working under President Wilson, Roosevelt had perpetuated ideas of American racial superiority by believing that the people of Latin American were incapable of self-government. However, by 1928 he had switched his point of view, becoming an advocate for cooperation.

The Great Depression meant that trade with foreign countries had suffered a massive blow, so the U.S. government were actively trying to find a way to compensate for it.

=== Policy ===
In an effort to denounce past U.S. interventionism and subdue any subsequent fears of Latin Americans, Roosevelt announced on March 4, 1933, during his inaugural address, "In the field of World policy, I would dedicate this nation to the policy of the good neighbor, the neighbor who resolutely respects himself and, because he does so, respects the rights of others, the neighbor who respects his obligations and respects the sanctity of his agreements in and with a World of neighbors." In order to create a friendly relationship between the United States and Central as well as South American countries, Roosevelt sought to abstain from asserting military force in the region. This position was affirmed by Cordell Hull, Roosevelt's secretary of state at a conference of American states in Montevideo in December 1933. Hull said: "No country has the right to intervene in the internal or external affairs of another." Roosevelt then confirmed the policy in December of the same year: "The definite policy of the United States from now on is one opposed to armed intervention."

=== Impact ===
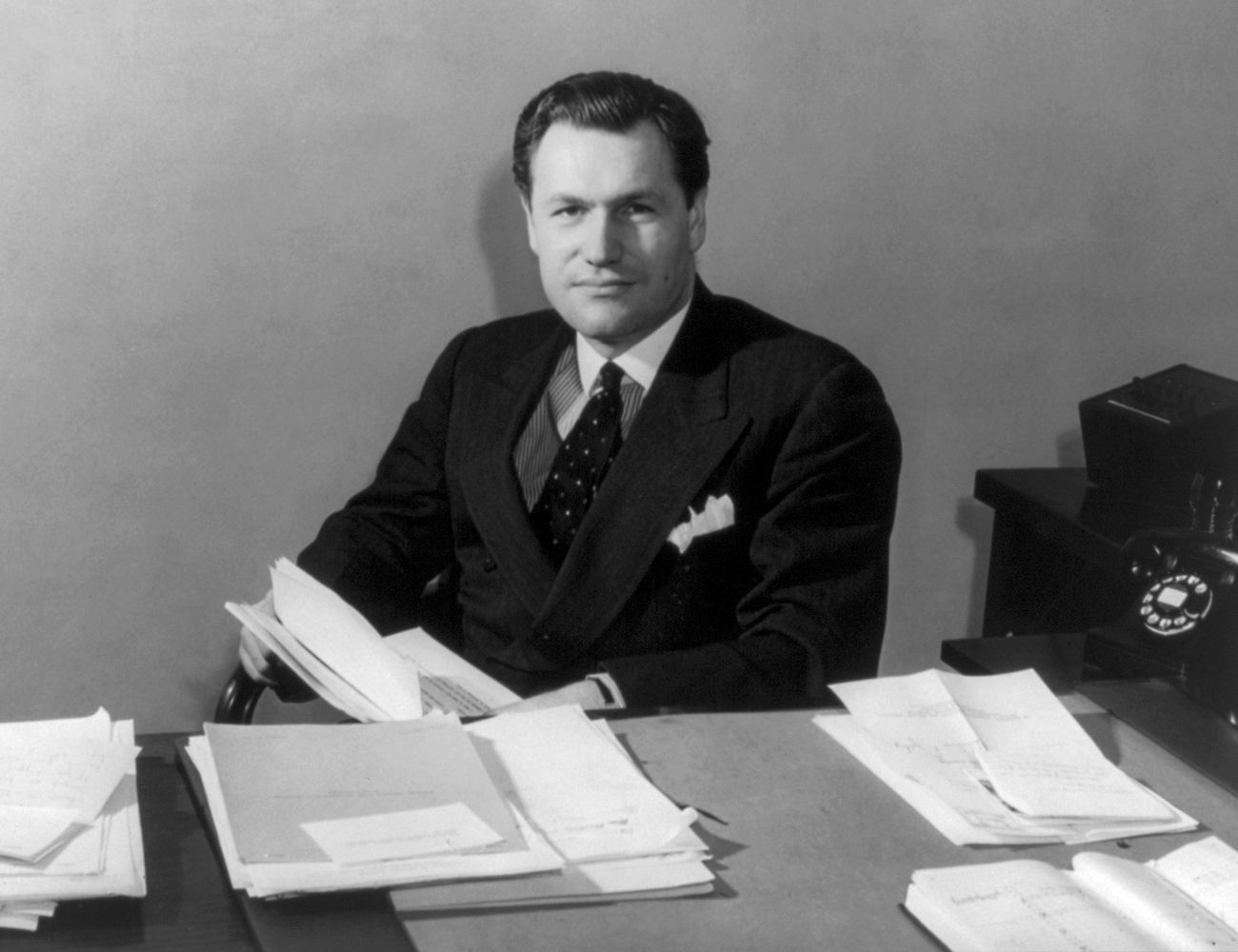
Nelson Rockefeller, Coordinator of Inter-American Affairs (1940)

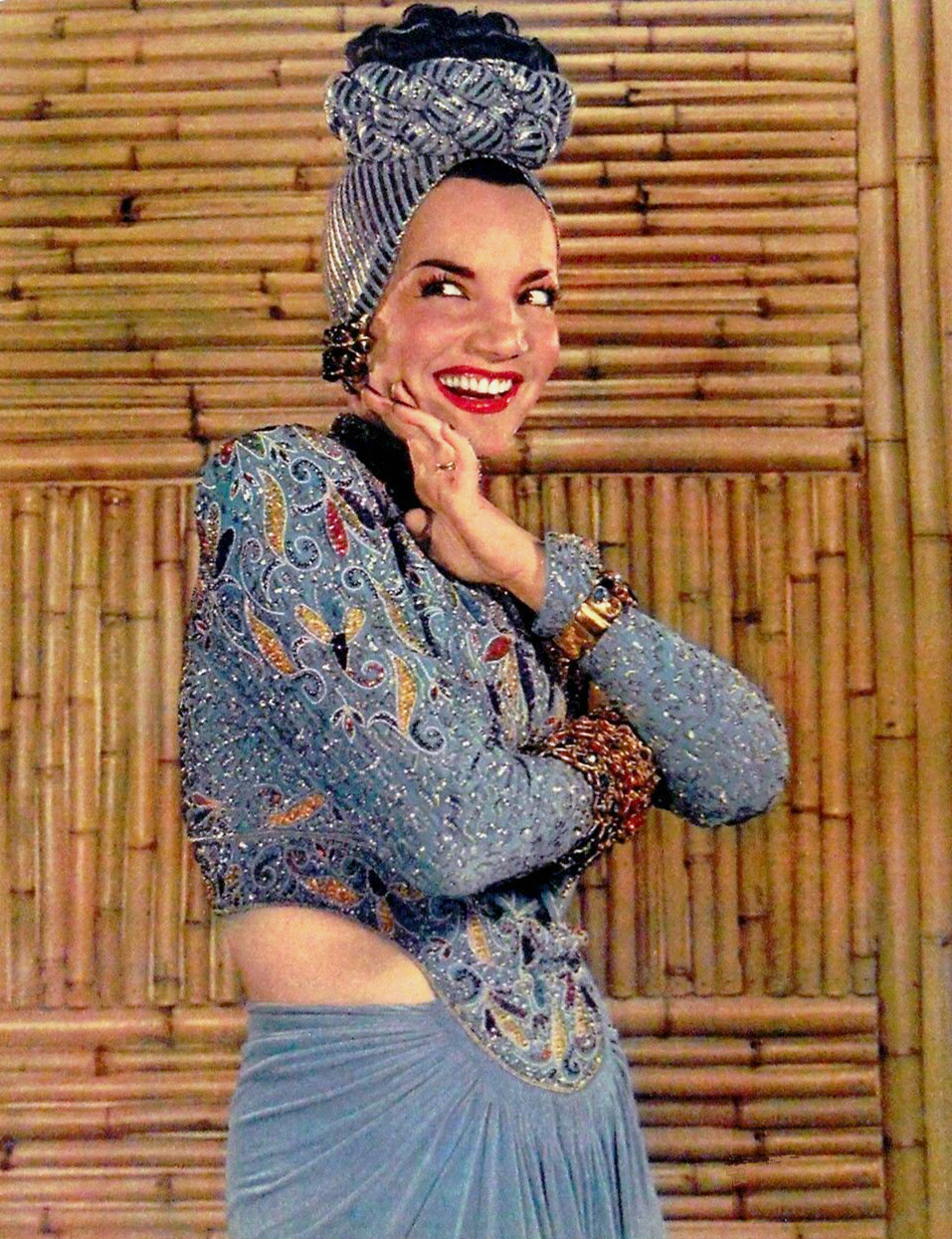
Carmen Miranda became the muse of the Good Neighbor policy.

The Good Neighbor Policy terminated the U.S. Marines occupation of Haiti in 1934, led to the annulment of the Platt Amendment by the Treaty of Relations with Cuba in 1934, and allowed for the negotiation of compensation for Mexico's nationalization of foreign-owned oil assets to take place in 1938.

The United States Maritime Commission contracted Moore-McCormack Lines to operate a "Good Neighbor fleet" of ten cargo ships and three recently laid-up ocean liners between the United States and South America. The passenger liners were the recently defunct Panama Pacific Line's SS California, Virginia and Pennsylvania. Moore-McCormack had them refurbished and renamed them SS Uruguay, Brazil and Argentina for their new route between New York and Buenos Aires via Rio de Janeiro, Santos, and Montevideo.

The policy sought to redefine the way Americans perceived Latin Americans, both politically as well as racially, while at the same time maintaining hemispheric unity. In order to accomplish this, Roosevelt created the Office of the Coordinator of Inter-American Affairs (OCIAA) in August 1940 and appointed Nelson Rockefeller to head the organization. The OCIAA was essentially a propaganda tool used by the United States to define Latin American society, as they perceived it. One division within the OCIAA, the Motion Picture Division, was headed by John Hay Whitney, with the main intent to abolish preexisting stereotypes of Latin Americans that were prevalent throughout American society. Whitney was convinced of:

The power that Hollywood films could exert in the two-pronged campaign to win the hearts and minds of Latin Americans and to convince Americans of the benefits of Pan-American friendship.

In order to accomplish this, Whitney urged film studios to hire Latin Americans and to produce movies that placed Latin America in a favorable light. Further, he urged filmmakers to refrain from producing movies that perpetuated negative stereotypes. Historically, Latin Americans were portrayed as lazy, backwards and suspicious. One film star who emerged then was Carmen Miranda. Used as a product to promote positive hemispheric relations, her films, including The Gang's All Here, explicitly promoted the Good Neighbor policy.

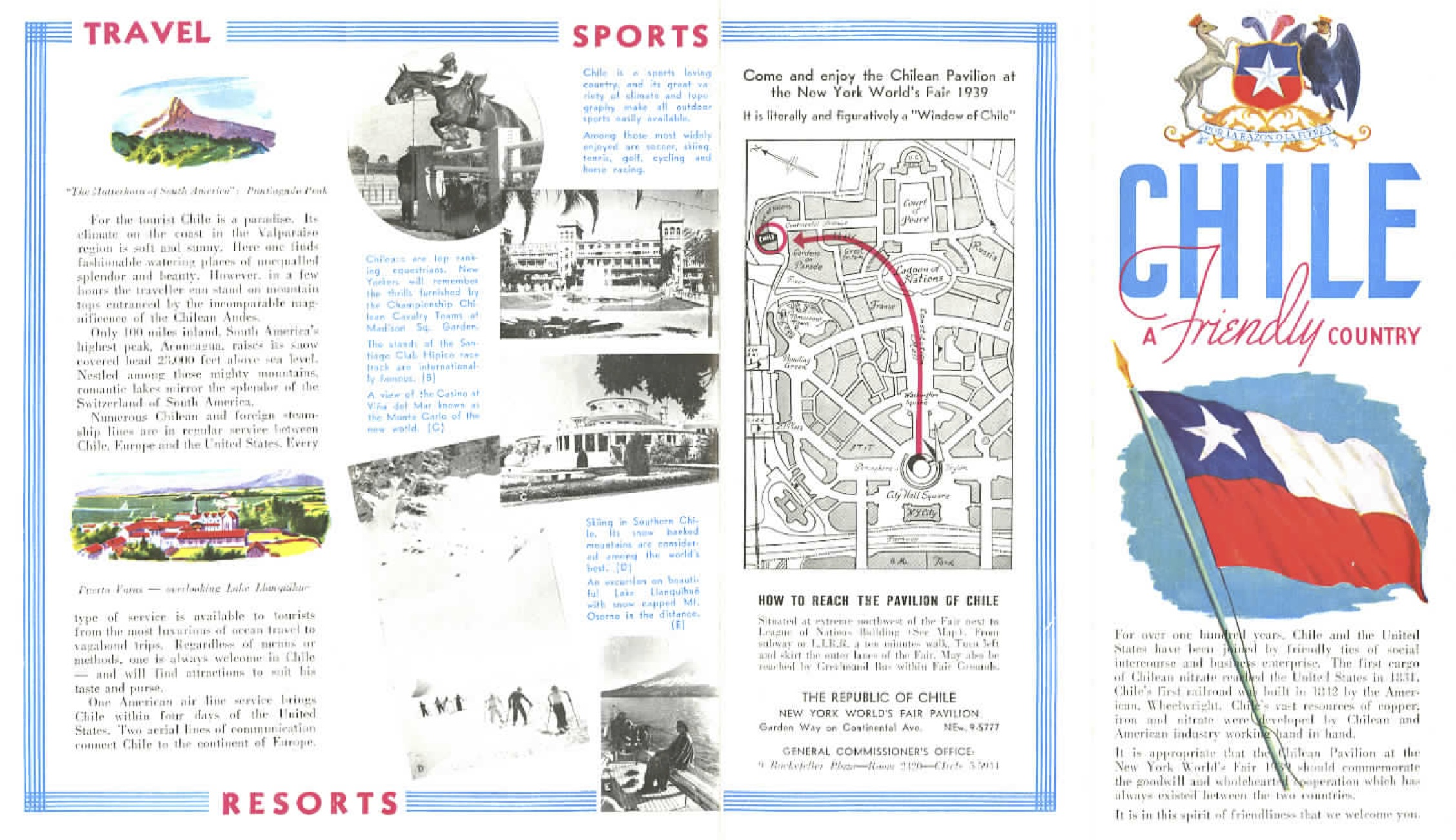
Pamphlet describing Chile as a "tourist paradise" during the 1939 World's Fair

Similarly, in 1941 William S. Paley and Edmund A. Chester at CBS Radio collaborated with the OCIAA to create the La Cadena de las Américas (Network of the Americas) radio network to broadcast news and cultural programs which reflected Roosevelt's Good neighbor Policy and Pan-Americanism throughout Latin America during World War II. As a professional journalist, Chester insisted upon the presentation of accurate news programming as well as cultural programs which dispelled the negative stereotype of Americans toiling as automatons in a national industrial machine. Also, the policy's cultural impact included the launch of CBS Radio's Viva América and Hello Americans programs and the Walt Disney films Saludos Amigos (1942) and The Three Caballeros (1944).

By the end of World War II, Latin America was, according to one historian, the region of the world most supportive of American foreign policy.

=== Further impact ===
By 1936, global peace was broken as nations in parts of Europe, Asia, and Africa were at war. Against this background the United States called for a special meeting of the Pan-American Union. Held in Buenos Aires from December 3 to December 26, 1936, the Inter-American Conference for the Maintenance of Peace received great attention from the countries of the western hemisphere. Franklin D. Roosevelt attended the meeting in person and delivered a speech in which he said that American countries are determined to live in peace and that if there is any aggression from outside, the countries of the western hemisphere are fully prepared to negotiate for their common security and interests.

The important results of the Buenos Aires Conference in 1936 led to further developments at the Pan-American Conference of Lima 1938, where the Conference of American States agreed in a declaration to settle all disputes peacefully, to refrain from interfering in other countries' internal affairs, to deny recognition of territories seized, and make it illegal to collect debts by force. The declaration was to be known as the "Declaration of Lima".

=== 1939 World's Fair ===
The 1939 New York World's Fair was just the place to promote neighborly relations between the United States and Latin America. Placed against the backdrop of a growing Nazi threat, the World's Fair was an attempt to escape from the looming prospect of war and to promote peace and interdependence between nations. With the fair boasting over 60 countries, with some coming from Latin America, it was the place to redefine negative Latin American stereotypes. Argentina, Brazil, Chile, Venezuela, Cuba, Mexico, Nicaragua, and the Pan American Union were all represented at the World's Fair. Each country seized the opportunity to showcase their country and to make it more appealing to those around the world, especially in the United States. In their bid to increase cultural awareness at the World's Fair, each country promoted tourism, and strived to compare itself to the United States in an effort to appeal to Americans.

=== Legacy ===
The era of the Good Neighbor Policy ended with the ramp-up of the Cold War in 1945, as the United States felt there was a greater need to protect the Western Hemisphere from Soviet influence. The changes conflicted with the Good Neighbor Policy's fundamental principle of non-intervention and led to a new wave of US involvement in Latin American affairs. Until the end of the Cold War the United States directly or indirectly attacked all suspected socialist or communist movements in the hope of ending the spread of Soviet influence. U.S. interventions and interference in this era included the CIA overthrow of Guatemala's president Jacobo Árbenz in 1954, the unsuccessful CIA-backed Bay of Pigs Invasion in Cuba in 1961, support for the 1964 Brazilian coup d'état which helped to remove from power democratically elected President João Goulart, the occupation of the Dominican Republic, in response to the Dominican Civil War, in 1965–1966, the CIA subversion of Chilean president Salvador Allende in 1970–1973, and support for the 1973 coup d'etat that removed Allende, and support for Operation Charly in Central America and Operation Condor in South America, and the CIA subversion of Nicaragua's Sandinista government from about 1981 to 1990.

After World War II, the Organization of American States was established in 1949. However, the U.S. began to shift its focus to aid and rebuilding efforts in Europe and Japan. These U.S. efforts largely neglected the Latin American countries, though U.S. investors and businessmen did have some stake in the nations to the South. In the late 1950s, United States strengthened relations with Latin America, launching the Inter-American Development Bank and later the Alliance for Progress. However, in the late 1960s, as part of the Cold War, the United States government provided support to right-wing dictatorships with Operation Condor. Also, in the context of the war on drugs, the United States government has collaborated with local governments to fight cartels, for example with the Plan Colombia and the Mérida Initiative.

=== Good Neighbor Policy to Brazil ===
Brazil had the most important branch of the Office of Inter-American Affairs on the entire continent. In all, 13 regional offices were created in different Brazilian capitals. Given Brazil's strategic importance for World War II, the country was the target of an immense U.S. propaganda effort, mainly through films, cartoons, and documentaries. According to one historian, from 1942 to 1945, relations between Brazil and the United States were intense. Many American artistic and intellectual personalities were in Brazil working on behalf of the Good Neighbor Policy, including Walt Disney, Orson Welles, Samuel G. Engel, Gregg Toland, and John Ford. During the war, U.S. propaganda films were seen by over 70 million Brazilian viewers.

In October 1940, the CIAA reached out to Disney Studios in effort to increase meaningful relationships between the United States and Latin America. As German and fascist influence began to expand around the world, the United States wanted to keep nations such as Argentina and Brazil close. Starting in August 1941 Walt Disney and his team would take a three-month tour through Latin America to mainly receive a better understanding of the area for their respective films. Starting in Brazil, the Disney Studios team would explore the country while working with the Brazilian people in order to prepare for future films. There were eventually two films that were produced in result of the Walt Disney Project; those two films being Saludos Amigos and The Three Caballeros. These two films included the likes of the famous Mickey Mouse and Donald Duck characters, who had become worldwide known figures. The two films, which were released in Latin America, worked to build better relations by including famous Disney characters into the world of Latin America. Walt Disney's portray of the Good Neighbor Policy seemed to be a success, as these films seemed to be very useful.

=== Good Neighbor Policy to Cuba ===
The Cuban Revolution of 1933 tested the Good Neighbor Policy, as some in the Roosevelt administration wanted full-scale military intervention in Cuba while Roosevelt wanted to avoid it.

The Good Neighbor Policy caused the annulment of the Platt Amendment in 1934, though the U.S. did continue to exert influence on Cuban affairs. In one notable example, the U.S. government expressed to the Cuban government that it should increase American quotas for Cuban sugar under a trade agreement, with the idea that it would benefit Cuba's local economy.

=== Significance ===
Good Neighbor diplomacy during Franklin Delano Roosevelt's presidency had alleviated some of the tensions that were caused by the United States being a previously bad neighbor. The earlier policies regarding U.S. military intervention and supervision under the Monroe Doctrine were unpopular with Latin Americans, since it was perceived as an invasive foreign policy measure. For example, U.S. president William Howard Taft used dollar diplomacy and dispatched 2,700 Marines to Nicaragua in order to suppress a revolution against the government of President Adolfo Díaz, which was directly threatening U.S. economic interests in Central America. After the United States successfully suppressed the revolution, Taft left Marines in Nicaragua to hinder and deter any other potential uprisings against the Díaz government. Roosevelt opposed U.S. intervention in Nicaragua, since he understood that Latin Americans opposed U.S. intervention and he viewed the Monroe Doctrine as a cooperative effort rather than an aggressive U.S. foreign policy measure. Being a Good Neighbor became synonymous with non-intervention, even though non-intervention had its exceptions. The United States did adhere to non-intervention when U.S. interests were not directly threatened, but the United States did continue to intervene when it was deemed necessary, such as having U.S. military personnel stationed within the Panama Canal Zone. Nevertheless, Good Neighbor diplomacy was an important collective effort between the United States and Latin America, which fostered a spirit of cooperation and produced a sense of hemispheric solidarity amongst each other as seen with the Declaration of Lima.

== See also ==
- President Franklin Roosevelt
- Anti-Americanism
- Cold War
- Interventionism (politics)
- Latin America–United States relations
- Monroe Doctrine
- Roosevelt Corollary
- United States occupation of Haiti
- List of United States invasions of Latin American countries
