= Eric Lewis (human rights attorney) =

American human rights attorney

Eric L. Lewis
- Education: Princeton University, Cambridge University, Yale Law School
- Notable work: Leaving Guantanamo: How One Country Brought Its Men Home from the Forever Prison (2026)

Eric L. Lewis is an American human rights attorney, writer, and columnist. He is the Chairman of Reprieve US and a senior partner at the Washington, D.C.-based law firm Lewis Baach Kaufmann Middlemiss (LBKM). Lewis has written for The Independent, The New York Times, the Washington Post, Esquire and other publications on topics including the death penalty, child sexual abuse, torture, the legal profession and human rights projects. He is an elected member of the American Law Institute and the Council on Foreign Relations.

== Early life ==
Lewis received his undergraduate degree from Princeton University. He later earned an M.Phil. from Cambridge University, where he was a Fulbright Scholar, and his Juris Doctor (J.D.) from Yale Law School, where he was an Articles and Book Review Editor of the Yale Law Journal. He served as law clerk to District of Columbia Circuit Judge David L. Bazelon.

== Legal career ==
Lewis is the chair of the law firm Lewis Baach Kaufmann Middlemiss, and Fellow of the American Bar Foundation. In the 1990s he represented the liquidators of BCCI in what was the largest bank collapse in history. He was also pivotal in cases involving the Madoff investment scandal, Laker Airways, and Carlyle Capital.

In 2020 Lewis served as an expert on US law for Assange's defense team.

== Human rights and advocacy ==
Lewis is a human rights advocate who has represented detainees at Guantánamo Bay. As the Chairman of Reprieve US, he oversees strategic litigation aimed at abolishing the death penalty and ending indefinite detention without trial.

In 2021 he represented Asadullah Haroon Gul, who became the first Guantánamo detainee in over a decade to successfully win a habeas corpus petition.

Lewis is a member of the Board of Advisers at the Bonavero Institute of Human Rights, which is a specialist research centre within the Faculty of Law at the University of Oxford.

== Journalism and media ==
Lewis is a columnist for The Independent's "Voices" section. His columns typically critique the "Global War on Terror," the use of the death penalty, and the intersection of American politics and judicial ethics. His work also appears in The New York Times, The New Yorker, Esquire, and The New York Law Journal. He is the author of Leaving Guantanamo: How One Country Brought Its Men Home from the Forever Prison (2026).
