= Platt Amendment =

1901 United States law on Cuban relations

- Long title: An Act making appropriation for the support of the Army for the fiscal year ending June thirtieth, nineteen hundred and two.
- Enacted by: the 56th United States Congress
- Effective: 1901

Citations
- Statutes at Large: Chapter 803, 31 Stat. 895, 897

Legislative history
- Introduced in the Senate as an amendment to H.R. 14017 by Orville H. Platt (R-CT); Passed the Senate on February 27, 1901 (43–20); Passed the House on March 1, 1901 (161–136); Signed into law by President William McKinley on March 2, 1901

The Platt Amendment was United States legislation enacted as part of the Army Appropriations Act of 1901 that defined the relationship between the United States and Cuba following the Spanish–American War. It stipulated seven conditions for the withdrawal of United States troops remaining in Cuba at the end of the Spanish–American War, and an eighth condition that Cuba sign a treaty accepting these seven conditions. It helped to define the terms of Cuba–United States relations.

On June 12, 1901, the Cuban Constitutional Assembly approved the Platt Amendment, which had been proposed by the United States of America. The document came with a withdrawal of U.S troops from Cuba after the Spanish-American War. It amended its constitution to contain, word for word, the seven applicable demands of the Platt Amendment.

On May 22, 1903, Cuba entered into a treaty with the United States to make the same required seven pledges: the Cuban–American Treaty of Relations of 1903. Two of the seven pledges were to allow the United States to intervene unilaterally in Cuban affairs, and a pledge to lease land to the United States for naval bases on the island. The Cuban–American Treaty of Relations of 1934 replaced the 1903 Treaty of Relations, and dropped three of the seven pledges.

The 1903 Treaty of Relations was used as justification for the Second Occupation of Cuba from 1906 to 1909. On September 29, 1906, Secretary of War and future U.S. president William Howard Taft initiated the Second Occupation of Cuba when he established the Provisional Government of Cuba under the terms of the treaty in Article three, declaring himself Provisional Governor of Cuba. On October 23, 1906, President Roosevelt issued Executive Order 518, ratifying the order.

On May 29, 1934, the United States and Cuba signed the 1934 Treaty of Relations that in its first article overrides the 1903 Treaty of Relations.

== Background ==
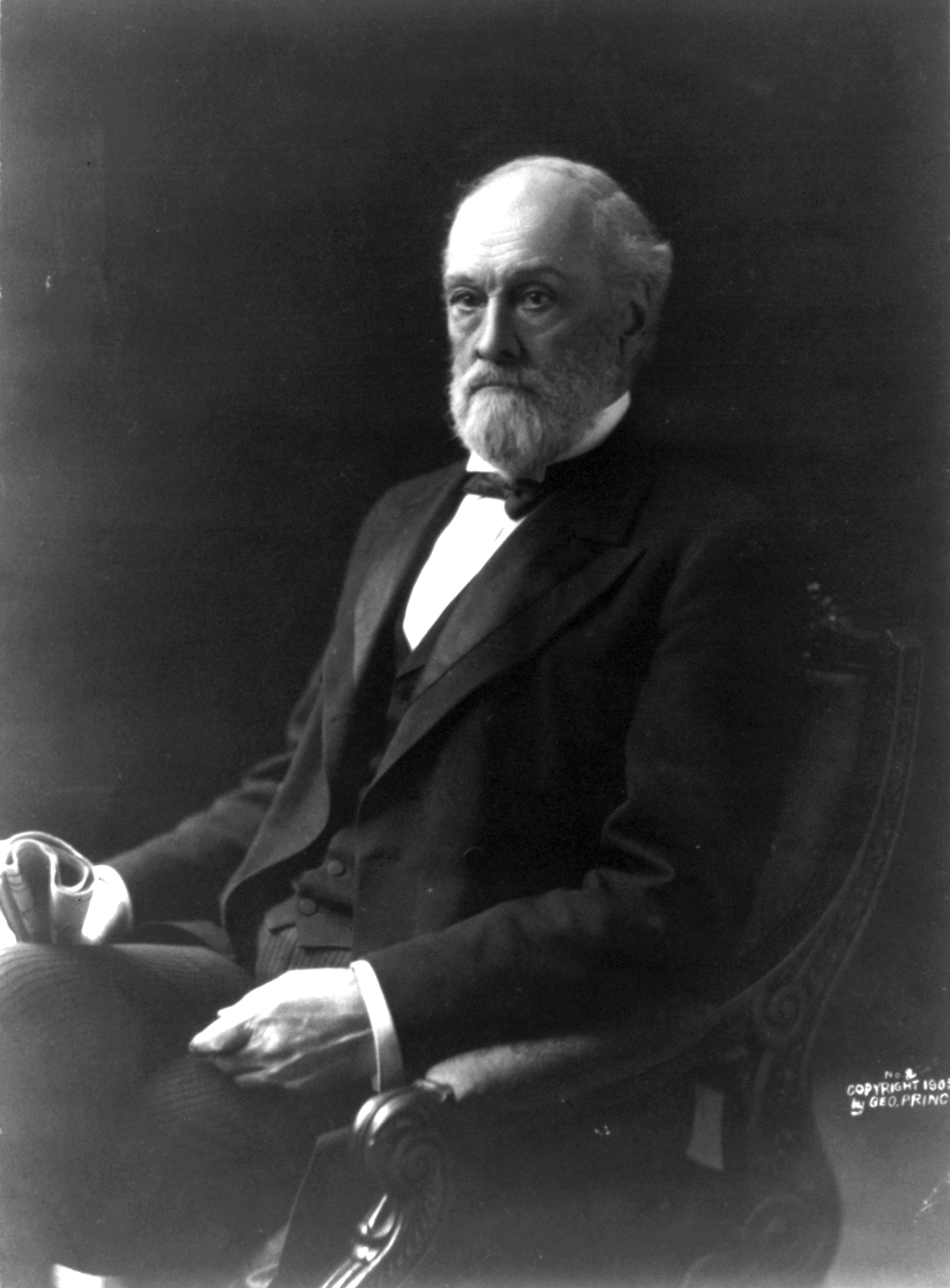
Senator Orville H. Platt, creator of the Platt Amendment

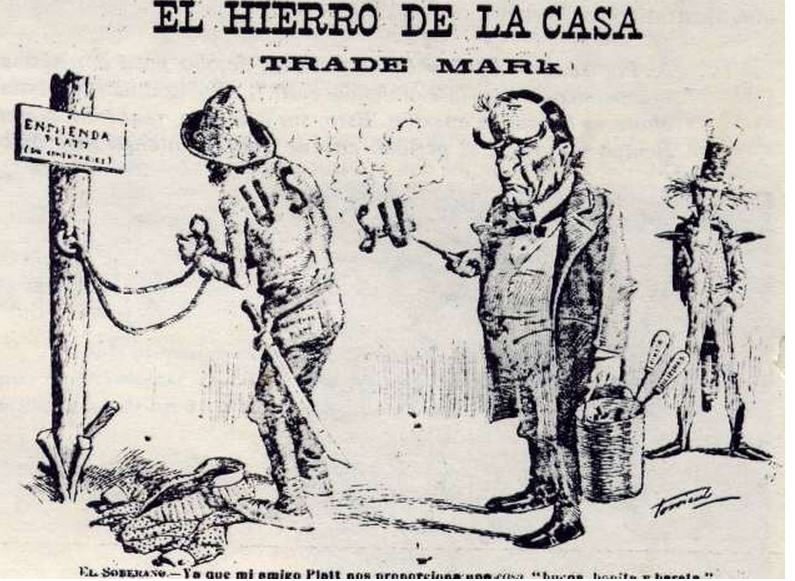
Cartoon protesting the Amendment

During the Spanish–American War, the United States maintained a large military arsenal in Cuba to protect U.S. holdings and to mediate Spanish–Cuban relations. In 1899, the McKinley administration settled on occupation as its response to the appearance of a revolutionary government in Cuba following the end of Spanish control.

The Platt Amendment was an addition to the earlier Teller Amendment, which had previously limited US involvement in Cuba relating to its treatment after the war. In particular, the Teller Amendment prevented annexation of Cuba by the US, which had been proposed by various expansionist American political entities. Senator Teller himself advocated for American expansionism, at least initially. In later years however, Teller grew to oppose American imperialism, criticising the American campaigns in Panama and the Philippines. Some historians have questioned Teller's intentions in writing the amendment, claiming that the real motive behind the resolution was to protect American sugar beet growers from Cuban competition. On the other hand, Teller became a leading opponent of land annexation in Cuba to grow sugar in the early 1900s, as well as President Roosevelt's plans to grant tariff preferences to Cuba in 1903.

The Platt Amendment originated from American mistrust in the Cuban Constituent Assembly and a desire to formulate a new relationship between Cuba and the U.S. Senator Orville H. Platt, chair of the Senate Committee on Relations with Cuba, spearheaded the bill alongside General Leonard Wood, the Governor of Cuba at the time, and Secretary of War Elihu Root. Tasked with balancing Cuban independence with American desires to control Cuban politicians deemed unfit for self-governance, they established the Platt Amendment to maintain public order and turn Cuba into a "self-governing colony". The Platt Amendment was initially intended to be its own bill, but it became an amendment as the 56th Congress ended on March 4, 1901, and there was no time for the proposal to be submitted as a separate bill.

Scholars have debated the question of who authored the Platt Amendment. Platt himself insisted that he was the main author, whereas others have argued that Root wrote the Platt Amendment while consulting with General Leonard Wood in Cuba.

The Platt Amendment forbade the Government of Cuba from going into any international agreement that could jeopardize or undermine Cuban independence or permit foreign powers other than the US to use the island for military purposes. It also gave the United States the absolute right to get involved in any Cuban affairs to defend Cuban independence and maintain a strong government that would serve justice to the people. The Amendment additionally required Cuba to lease the United States Cuban land for a coaling station and naval base, which the US still controls at Guantanamo Bay. Lastly, the amendment compelled the Cuban Government to end treaty negotiations with the US by ratifying the amendment in the Cuban constitution.

During American-Cuban negotiations, the United States maintained a provisional military presence in Cuba. American General Leonard Wood, appointed Governor of Cuba, used the financial resources of the Cuban treasury to create sanitation systems. A handful of civil rights, including the right to vote, were extended to literate, adult, male Cubans with property worth $250 or more, largely resulting in exclusion of the Afro-Cuban population and women from participation.

== Provisions of the amendment ==
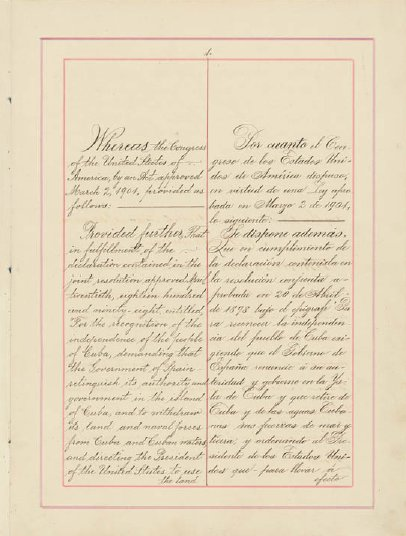
Platt Amendment, p. 1

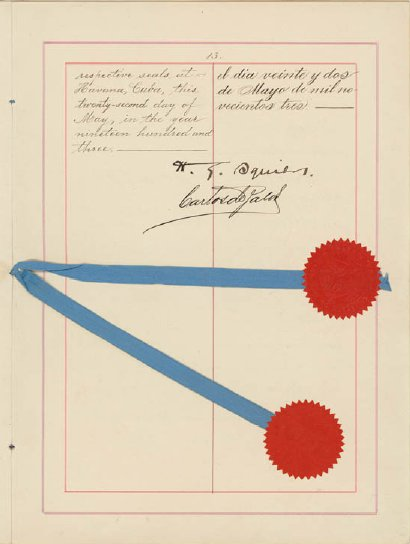
Platt Amendment, p. 2

The Platt Amendment was introduced to Congress by Senator Orville H. Platt on February 25, 1901. It passed the U.S. Senate by a vote of 43 to 20, and although it was initially rejected by the Cuban assembly, the amendment was eventually accepted by a vote of 16 to 11 with four abstentions and integrated into the 1901 Cuban Constitution.

The Platt Amendment outlined the role of the United States in Cuba and the Caribbean, limiting Cuba's right to make treaties with other nations and restricting Cuba in the conduct of foreign policy and commercial relations. It also established that Cuba's boundaries would not include the Isle of Pines (Isla de la Juventud) until its title could be established in a future treaty, and that Cuba must sell or lease lands to the United States necessary for coaling or the development of naval stations.

It read:

Preamble: For the recognition of the independence of the people of Cuba, demanding that the Government of Spain relinquish its authority and government in the island of Cuba, and withdraw its land and naval forces from Cuba and Cuban waters, and directing the President of the United States to use the land and naval forces of the United States to carry these resolutions into effect, the President is hereby authorized to "leave the government and control of the island of Cuba to its people" so soon as a government shall have been established in said island under a constitution which, either as a part thereof or in an ordinance appended thereto, shall define the future relations of the United States with Cuba.

I. That the government of Cuba shall never enter into any treaty or other compact with any foreign power or powers which will impair or tend to impair the independence of Cuba, nor in any manner authorize or permit any foreign power or powers to obtain by colonization or for military or naval purposes or otherwise, lodgement in or control over any portion of said island.

II. That said government shall not assume or contract any public debt, to pay the interest upon which, and to make reasonable sinking fund provision for the ultimate discharge of which, the ordinary revenues of the island, after defraying the current expenses of government shall be inadequate.

III. That the government of Cuba consents that the United States may exercise the right to intervene for the preservation of Cuban independence, the maintenance of a government adequate for the protection of life, property, and individual liberty, and for discharging the obligations with respect to Cuba imposed by the treaty of Paris on the United States, now to be assumed and undertaken by the government of Cuba.

IV. That all Acts of the United States in Cuba during its military occupancy thereof are ratified and validated, and all lawful rights acquired thereunder shall be maintained and protected.

V. That the government of Cuba will execute, and as far as necessary extend, the plans already devised or other plans to be mutually agreed upon, for the sanitation of the cities of the island, to the end that a recurrence of epidemic and infectious diseases may be prevented, thereby assuring protection to the people and commerce of Cuba, as well as to the commerce of the southern ports of the United States and the people residing therein.

VI. That the Isle of Pines shall be omitted from the proposed constitutional boundaries of Cuba, the title thereto being left to future adjustment by treaty.

VII. That to enable the United States to maintain the independence of Cuba, and to protect the people thereof, as well as for its own defense, the government of Cuba will sell or lease to the United States lands necessary for coaling or naval stations at certain specified points to be agreed upon with the President of the United States.

VIII. That by way of further assurance the government of Cuba will embody the foregoing provisions in a permanent treaty with the United States.

After U.S. President Theodore Roosevelt withdrew American troops from the island in 1902, Cuba signed the treaty the next year after which Cuba executed a lease of land to the United States for a coaling and naval station at Guantánamo Bay. Originally the U.S. would have been able to build four military bases, but Cuba managed to negotiate this down to two, those being Guantanamo and Bahía Honda, which was traded in 1912 for more land at Guantanamo. This was a surprise given that Secretary Root had indicated his wish for the U.S. to become the owner and enforcer of Cuba's waterfront while the Platt Amendment was being drafted.

== Aftermath ==
Following acceptance of the amendment, the United States ratified a tariff that gave Cuban sugar preference in the U.S. market and protection to select U.S. products in the Cuban market. The huge American investment in sugar led to land being concentrated into the hands of the largest sugar mills, however, with estimates that 20% of all Cuban land was owned by these mills. This led to further impoverishment of the rural masses. Workers on the mill were in constant fear of eviction, with cheap imported labor from other parts of the Caribbean keeping wages very low and the prices for independent sugarcane pushed down to a minimum. In addition, the mills monopolized the railroads and ran them for private benefit. The lack of consumer purchasing power and the limited market available for manufactured goods meant that little industrialization would occur in the decade after the 1903 Treaty of Relations. Overall, over $200 million was spent by American companies on Cuban sugar between 1903 and 1913.

Tomás Estrada Palma, who had once favored outright annexation of Cuba by the United States, became president of Cuba on May 20, 1902. He was re-elected in 1905 despite accusations of fraud from his liberal opponents, but was forced to resign along with the rest of the executive when opposition against his rule turned violent. The U.S. invoked the Platt Amendment to begin the Second Occupation of Cuba and install a Provisional Government.

Political instability and frequent American occupation through the early 1900s meant that legitimate constitutional rule was increasingly difficult to come about. Though Cuban citizens enjoyed an improved standard of living in this period, Article 40 of the 1901 Cuban Constitution and Article III of the Platt Amendment meant that constitutional rights could be suspended under emergency provisions. Therefore, the Platt Amendment contributed to an erosion of the individual rights of the Cuban people, and it was not long before the Cuban public were calling for a replacement to the 1901 Constitution.

The Platt Amendment was a major blow to hopes of social advancement for Afro-Cubans, who hoped that their participation in the Spanish–American War would mean equality with the white planters and commercial elites of Cuba. Nearly 40% of the Cuban fighting force against Spain were made up of people of color, and Afro-Cubans had spent generations fighting for their country's independence. As well as becoming disenfranchised through voting acts, Afro-Cubans were also blocked from many state institutions as they now required educational or property qualifications to be gained.

Tensions between Afro-Cubans and U.S. military officials were rife, with hostile language and sometimes gunfire being exchanged between the two groups. Frustrated middle class blacks would launch the Independent Party of Colour (PIC) in 1908, but this was barred by the Cuban Congress soon along with all other parties of colour, accused of inciting race war. The PIC's call for limited armed protests would eventually spark the Negro Rebellion of 1912 which killed between 3,000 and 6,000. The rebellion was defeated by the Cuban army and led to the PIC dissolving afterwards. The U.S. sent 1,292 Marines to protect the American-owned companies, as well as copper mines, railroads, and trains. The Marines had only one skirmish with the rebels with no casualties on either side.

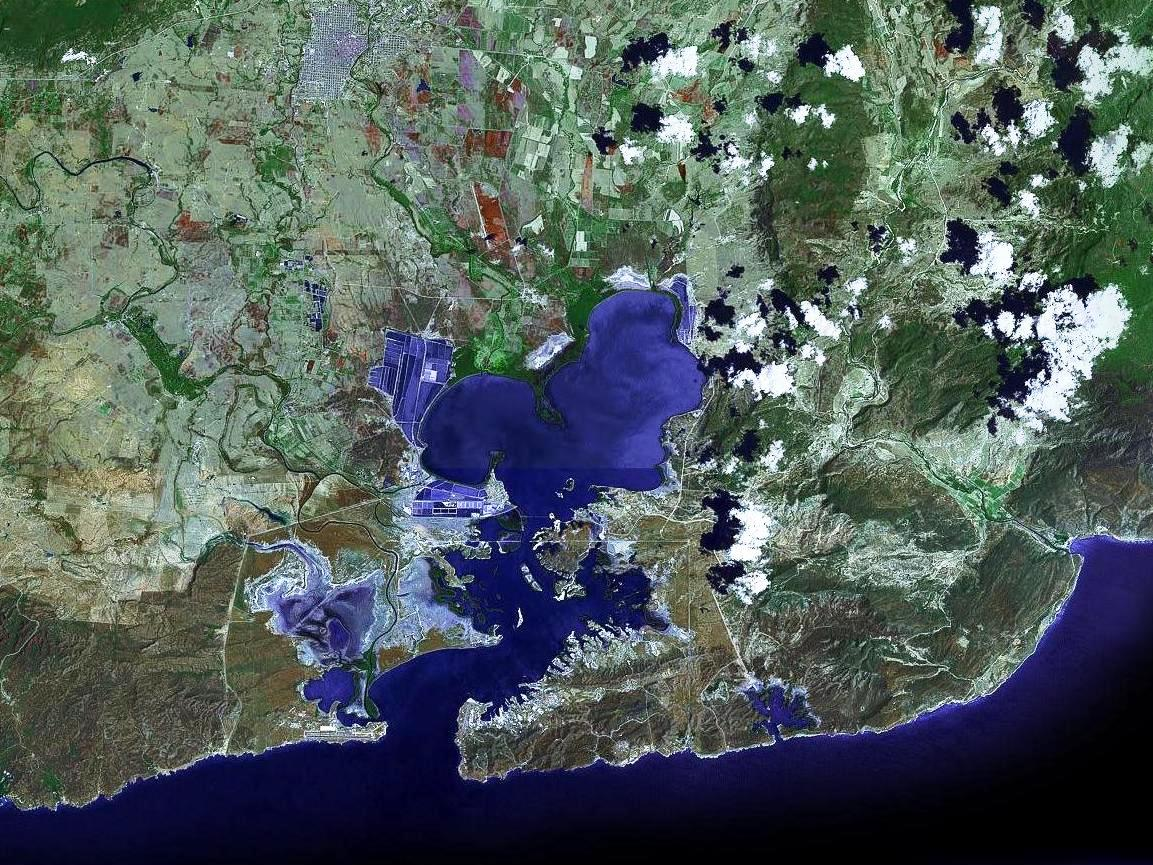
Guantanamo Bay from satellite images

Women activists were also disappointed by the result of the Platt Amendment's conditions. As with Afro-Cubans, women played important roles in the Cuban independence movement and were characterised as 'mambisas', or courageous warrior mothers symbolizing the struggle for social justice. However, they were also denied voting rights and female suffrage would not be obtained until 1940. Any attempts by women to discuss equality of the sexes with the Cuban government saw them labeled as nationalists or flat out ignored.

Most of the Platt Amendment provisions were repealed in 1934 when the Cuban–American Treaty of Relations of 1934 between the United States and Cuba was negotiated as a part of U.S. president Franklin Roosevelt's "Good Neighbor policy" toward Latin America. José Manuel Cortina and other members of the Cuban Constitutional Convention of 1940 eliminated the Platt Amendment from the new Cuban constitution.

The long-term lease of Guantanamo Bay Naval Base continues. The Cuban government since 1959 has strongly denounced the treaty as a violation of Article 52 of the 1969 Vienna Convention on the Law of Treaties, which declares a treaty void if procured by the threat or use of force. However, Article 4 of the Vienna Convention states that its provisions shall not be applied retroactively.

Historian Louis A. Perez Jr. has argued that the Platt Amendment resulted in the conditions it had hoped to avoid, including Cuban volatility.

== In popular culture ==
The Platt Amendment is used in the 1982 film Fast Times at Ridgemont High as an example of high school students not paying attention in class.

== See also ==
- Pearcy v. Stranahan (1907), U.S. Supreme Court case on the status of the Isle of Pines
- Spooner Amendment (1901), pertaining to the Philippines
- Teller Amendment (1898), recognizing Cuba's right to independence
- Guantanamo Bay Naval Base, leased to the US under the Platt Amendment
