= Cuban–American Treaty of Relations (1934) =

1934 treaty between Cuba and the United States

Treaty of relations
- Signed: May 29, 1934
- Location: Washington, D.C.
- Effective: June 9, 1934
- Signatories: Cuba; United States
- Citations: 48 Stat. 1682; TS 866; 6 Bevans 1161
- Abrogated the Treaty of Relations of 1903 (TS 437; 6 Bevans 1116).

The Cuban–American Treaty of Relations took effect on June 9, 1934. It abrogated the Treaty of Relations of 1903.

== Overview ==
The Cuban-American Treaty of Relations of 1934 replaced the Cuban–American Treaty of Relations (1903) in which Cuba committed to:

1. not permit a foreign power to obtain a naval base on the island
2. not go into excessive debt
3. grant the US the right to intervene in Cuba for the maintenance of (an adequate) government
4. approve all prior military actions by the United States
5. take measures to reduce infectious diseases
6. determine sovereignty over the Isle of Pines by a later treaty (Note: The United States recognized the Isle of Pines in the Hay-Quesada Treaty of 1926.)
7. lease lands for naval stations to the United States

The purpose of the 1903 treaty was to force Cuba to agree to recognize all U.S. military during its occupancy as lawful, to allow the U.S. to maintain and be able to quarantine their naval base in times of outbreak, and to allow the U.S. to intervene on behalf of Cuba so that it may preserve Cuban independence. However, the events that transpired in the decades after, such as the overthrow of the standing Cuban government, caused the United States government to re-evaluate and revise the initial treaty, in the form of the Cuban-American Treaty of Relations of 1934. The purpose of this was to maintain that Cuba would agree to recognize all prior U.S. military actions as lawful and allow the U.S. to maintain (Article IV and Article V) and be able to quarantine their naval base but to also nullify the provisions of the 1903 treaty, whereby the involvement of the United States in the affairs of the Cuban government impeded the sovereignty of Cuba.

The Cuban government expressed that the presence of a naval base on their island was a cause for concern on behalf of the sovereignty of the country. They argued that the right of the United States to establish naval bases in Cuba was self-granted, being both imposed and maintained by force. In addition, they argued that by being forced to lease and sell land to the United States, the Republic of Cuba was relinquishing territorial sovereignty, and thus the sovereignty of the nation was compromised.

== Overthrow of the Cuban Government ==
The President of Cuba in 1933 was Gerardo Machado. At this time, there was a movement in opposition to Machado, to which he responded by using brutality. U.S. ambassador Benjamin Sumner Welles went to the American Embassy in Havana to advise Machado to restitute the constitutional guarantees. Machado rejected this advice and in the following months a large strike took place in Havana, and soon spread throughout the entire island. A conspiracy against Machado was discovered within the Cuban army and when Machado attempted to look into it, several officers informed him that unless he resigned, he risked intervention from the United States. Machado then resigned and fled the country. Carlos M. Céspedes took his place as the president.

Several weeks later, another uprising took place, by dissatisfied sergeants led by Fulgencio Batista. They took control of the island and forced Céspedes and his cabinet out of the Presidential palace. Céspedes was replaced by Ramón Grau San Martín as the president. The government under Ramón Grau San Martín was never recognized by the United States, and he was forced to resign in January of 1934. The United States recognized the Cuban government under Carlos Mendieta, when he took the office of President on January 20, 1934.

== Good Neighbor Policy ==
The Good Neighbor Policy was an idea that Franklin D. Roosevelt mentioned in his first inaugural address. The Good Neighbor Policy was a policy that opposed the involvement of the United States in the affairs of Latin American nations that Roosevelt implemented in efforts to improve relations with Latin America. In December of 1933, Roosevelt declared: “The definite policy of the United States from now on is one opposed to armed intervention.”

== Cuban-American Treaty of Relations of 1934 ==
The Cuban-American Treaty of Relations of 1934 was signed in Washington on May 29, 1934. Most of the articles from the Platt Amendment were done away with. It contained five articles, which were conditions that the government of Cuba agreed to by signing. Article I stated that the Cuban-American Treaty of Relations of 1903 would be abrogated. Article II, carried over from the 1903 treaty, stated that the Cuban government would deem previous military actions of the United States as lawful. Article III, also carried over from the 1903 treaty, stated that the government of Cuba would allow the United States to keep its naval stations, specifically the station in Guantanamo. Article IV stated that the Cuban government would acknowledge the right of the United States to quarantine its naval bases in the instance of the outbreak of disease. Article V stated that both governments agreed to ratify the treaty in Washington as soon as possible.

== The 1934 treaty ==
In 1934, a new Treaty of Relations replaced the 1903 Treaty of Relations. Articles IV and V of the 1903 Treaty were carried forward to the new Treaty: Cuba agreed to continue to recognize as lawful all prior military actions taken by the United States and it was agreed that the base could be quarantined in times of contagion. The lease for the Naval Station, contemplated in article VII of the 1903 Treaty, was recognized as having been agreed to and its provisions continuing.

One motivation for the 1934 Treaty of Relations was to remove the irritating provisions of the 1903 Treaty, as part of Franklin Roosevelt's Good Neighbor Policy. Provisions of the 1903 Treaty were seen to be an affront to Cuban sovereignty.

== See also ==
- Guantánamo Bay
- Cuba-United States relations, a history
