= José Ignacio Rodríguez Hernández =

Cuban lawyer, jurist, and writer (1831–1907)

José Ignacio Rodríguez
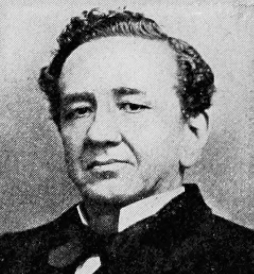
- Born: José Ignacio Rodríguez y Hernández; November 11, 1831; Havana, Captaincy General of Cuba, Spanish Empire
- Died: February 1, 1907 (aged 75); Washington, D.C.

José Ignacio Rodríguez (November 11, 1831 – February 1, 1907) was a Cuban-American lawyer, jurist, writer, historian, and pro-Pan Americanist. He was the first librarian of the Pan American Union and Columbus Memorial Library. Rodríguez served as legal counsel for numerous Cuban claimants before various Spanish and American claims commissions, including the cases of Antonio Maximo Mora, Julio Sanguily, Néstor Ponce de León, Jose M. Delgado, and the Virginius affair.

== Biography ==
=== Early life and education ===
José Ignacio Rodríguez y Hernández was born on November 11, 1831, in Havana, Spanish Cuba. His parents were José Ignacio Rodríguez and Catalina Hernández.

Graduating in law from the University of Havana in 1849 and obtaining a Doctor of Philosophy in 1853. He was admitted to the bar in Havana and earned his licentiate of law on July 24, 1855. He became a professor of Natural philosophy and Chemistry at the Havana Preparatory Technical School in 1856. He went on to teach law at the University of Havana. Vidal Morales y Morales was a former pupil of his in Havana. While working at the university, he joined in the procession of Dr. Elisha Kent Kane on February 20, 1857, for the conveyance of his remains to the U.S. via the steamer The Catawba.

By 1863, he was a Doctor of Civil Law and Commercial Law.

On February 21, 1863, he was involved in the third general meeting of the Royal Development Board and Royal Economic Society of Havana, at the Government Palace, presided over by Captain General Dulce.

In Havana on February 14, 1864, Rodríguez wrote the autobiography of the rector of the University of Havana, Elogio del Excmo. Sr. Dr. Manuel Gómez-Marañón, Rector que fue de la Real Universidad.

=== Ten Years' War ===
Amid the Ten Years' War, in 1869, Rodríguez, along with other Cuban reformers, backed the reform agenda of the liberal governor Domingo Dulce.

José Ignacio Rodríguez wrote The Book of Blood in 1871, with the English translation by Néstor Ponce de León published in 1873. By documenting the savage treatment of Cubans by the Spanish, the book aimed to prompt the U.S. government to intervene against Spain.

=== Career ===
By the mid-1870s, Rodríguez, now an American citizen, had established a legal practice in Washington, D.C., focusing on Latin American issues. He studied law under Chief Justice Caleb Cushing and was admitted to the bar of the District of Columbia and the Supreme Court.

He published the autobiography of José de la Luz y Caballero, titled Vida de Don José de la Luz y Caballero, in 1874, and that of Félix Varela, titled Vida del presbítero don Félix Varela, in 1878.

Rodríguez took on the role of estate administrator in 1882 under the Probate Court in the District of Columbia, overseeing legal matters and asset distribution. He additionally handled the 1882–83 case of Néstor Ponce de León against the Spanish colonial authorities in Cuba, concerning the 1869 embargo of his property by Lt. Gov. Domingo Dulce, 1st Marquis of Castell-Florite.

Rodríguez, aligned with annexationist views, was in favor of the U.S. Government's acquisition of Cuba's independence by purchase.

==== First Pan American Conference ====
In February 1890, he served as secretary at the first International American Conference, commonly known as the Pan-American Conference. He succeeded Fidel G. Pierra as the Spanish Secretary of the Conference. The interpreters were responsible for promptly translating speeches, and highlighting the key remarks of each delegate. In Washington, D.C. in 1891, he served as secretary of the International Monetary Commission presided over by Matías Romero.

During a special term for Orphans' Court on March 19, 1892, he went to take out letters testamentary as the executor of a will, seeking formal legal authority to administer the deceased person's estate. He worked on the 1893 case of Antonio Maximo Mora, which pursued indemnity for property taken by the Spanish government as retribution for his advocacy of Cuban independence. The case was settled for $1,000,000 in 1895.

He was involved with the translation of The Authentic Letters of Columbus by William Eleroy Curtis and published by Field Columbian Museum in May 1895.

Taking on the role of power of attorney for José Manuel Delgado in July 1896, Rodríguez filed claims for the injuries and indignities inflicted on Delgado, as well as for the destruction of property by the Spanish authorities. In 1897, he served as the legal counsel of Julio Sanguily, who was released in 1898. From Washington, he published The Case of the Arrest, Trial and Sentence in the City of Havana, Island of Cuba of Julio Sanguily: A Citizen of the United States of America.

As a private adviser on Spanish law, he traveled to Paris, France in 1898 for the U.S. Peace Commission, which secured the Treaty of Paris and ended the Spanish Empire. In 1901, he published Anexión de Cuba (English: Annexation of Cuba), a detailed work exploring the political and historical context of Cuba's potential annexation.

==== International Bureau of American Republics ====
On April 7, 1902, the Governing Board of the International Bureau of American Republics appointed him to the post of Chief Translator for the International Bureau of American Republics (now Organization of American States) and the first librarian of the Columbus Memorial Library in Washington. From its early days, he led the International Bureau of the American Republics library until his passing.

At the Second International American Conference in Mexico City in October 1902, he was the designated official interpreter for the United States delegation. In July 1903, he earned $2,700.00 as the chief interpreter of the International Bureau of the American Republics.

== Death ==
José Ignacio Rodríguez died on February 1, 1907, in Washington, D.C.
