= Vidal Morales y Morales =

Cuban lawyer, historian, and writer (1848–1904)

Vidal Morales
- Born: Vidal Morales y Morales; April 21, 1848; Havana, Captaincy General of Cuba, Spanish Empire
- Died: August 27, 1904 (aged 56); Havana, Cuba
- Other name: Mommsen of Cuba

Vidal Morales y Morales (April 21, 1848 – August 27, 1904) was a Cuban lawyer, writer, and historian.

== Biography ==
=== Early life and education ===
Vidal Morales y Morales was born on April 21, 1848, in Havana, Spanish Cuba. He was born into a family distinguished for centuries in Cuban history, possessing vast estates and participating closely in the governance of the island, especially within the Ayuntamiento of Havana. From an early age, he was drawn to the past and serious historical study. His uncle, Dr. Antonio Bachiller y Morales, was the author of Cuba Primitiva.

Morales completed his civil law studies at the University of Havana. He was a pupil of José Ignacio Rodríguez's teachings in Havana. By 1872, he had become a Doctor of Jurisprudence. He was the founding secretary of the Havana College of Lawyers (Spanish: Colegio de Abogados de la Habana) in Havana.

=== Cuban Anthropological Society ===
On September 16, 1877, the Anthropological Society of the Island of Cuba (Spanish: Sociedad Antropologica de la Isla de Cuba) elected its new board for 1877–1878, with Morales among the members in attendance. His study of the Cuban autonomy movement appeared in a series of articles titled The Island of Cuba in its Different Constitutional Periods, first published in the Havana magazine El Triunfo in 1879.

In 1882, Vidal Morales y Morales had been in contact with Marcos Jiménez de la Espada to find out if the second volume of La Guerra de Quito had been published.

=== Royal Economic Society of Friends of the Country ===
He attended the inauguration of the "Royal Academy of Medical, Physical, and Natural Sciences" (now the Cuban Academy of Sciences) in Havana on May 19, 1886, as a correspondent for the Royal Economic Society of Friends of the Country (Spanish: Sociedad Económica de los Amigos del País).

He donated a volume to the Boston Public Library from Havana, in 1888.

In 1891, Morales wrote his first piece appearing in La Tertulia, a publication of Cuban cultural promotion.

By 1892, the noted biographer Morales was in possession of an unpublished manuscript for José Antonio Saco's autobiography.

=== U.S. occupation of Cuba ===
On August 2, 1899, the military governor of Cuba, Leonard Wood, assigned Vidal Morales y Morales to be an associate justice of Pinar del Río Province.

==== National Archive of Cuba ====
Appointed the chief of the Archives of Cuba by Gen. Wood on January 25, 1900, he began overseeing the Archivo Nacional de la República de Cuba in February. He was the founder of its bulletin. His extensive knowledge and tireless historical research justly earned him the title of Mommsen of Cuba. Julio Ponce de León, son of Nestor Ponce de León, served as his assistant.

In January 1901, he published Initiators and First Martyrs of the Cuban Revolution (Spanish: Inciadores y Primeros Mártires de la Revolución Cubana) in Havana. The work, grounded in deep research, was a valuable resource for tracing Cuba's early pursuit of enlightenment, liberty, and happiness.

He wrote the historical manual, Notions of Cuban History (Spanish: Nociones de Historia de Cuba), published in 1901. The texts were the leading textbooks on Cuban history in elementary schools. A 1902 manual for Cuba's teacher certification exam included letters by Morales, Manuel Sanguily, Nicolás Heredia, Carlos de la Torre, Manuel Valdés Rodríguez, and Esteban Borrero. It was approved by the Board of Superintendents of Public Schools of the Island of Cuba on November 25, 1903.

When the American government established the National Library of Havana within the Cuartel de la Feurza in 1902, the chief of the Archives of Cuba enriched it with his valuable private historical collection. The collection reflected 25 years of collecting books relating to Cuba and Spanish-American history. It included a 1552 Las Casas from Seville, a 1565 edition of Girolamo Benzoni's The History of the New World, the dreams of José María Heredia y Heredia, and Plácido's poetry. He worked alongside librarian Domingo Figarola-Caneda.

In the early months of 1904, Morales y Morales had publications in the January, February, and March issues of the magazine Cuba Pedagógica. His work Hombres del 68 (English: Men of '68) was also published in 1904.

== Death ==
Morales died at 56 years old in Havana, Cuba, on August 27, 1904.
