= Sanguily =

Sanguily can be both a middle name and a surname. Notable people with the name include:

- Manuel Sanguily Garritte (1848–1925), Cuban statesman
- Manuel Sanguily (1933–2022), Cuban-American swimmer and physician
- Julio Sanguily (1845–1906), Cuban independence activist
