= Javier Perez-Capdevila =

Cuban scientist

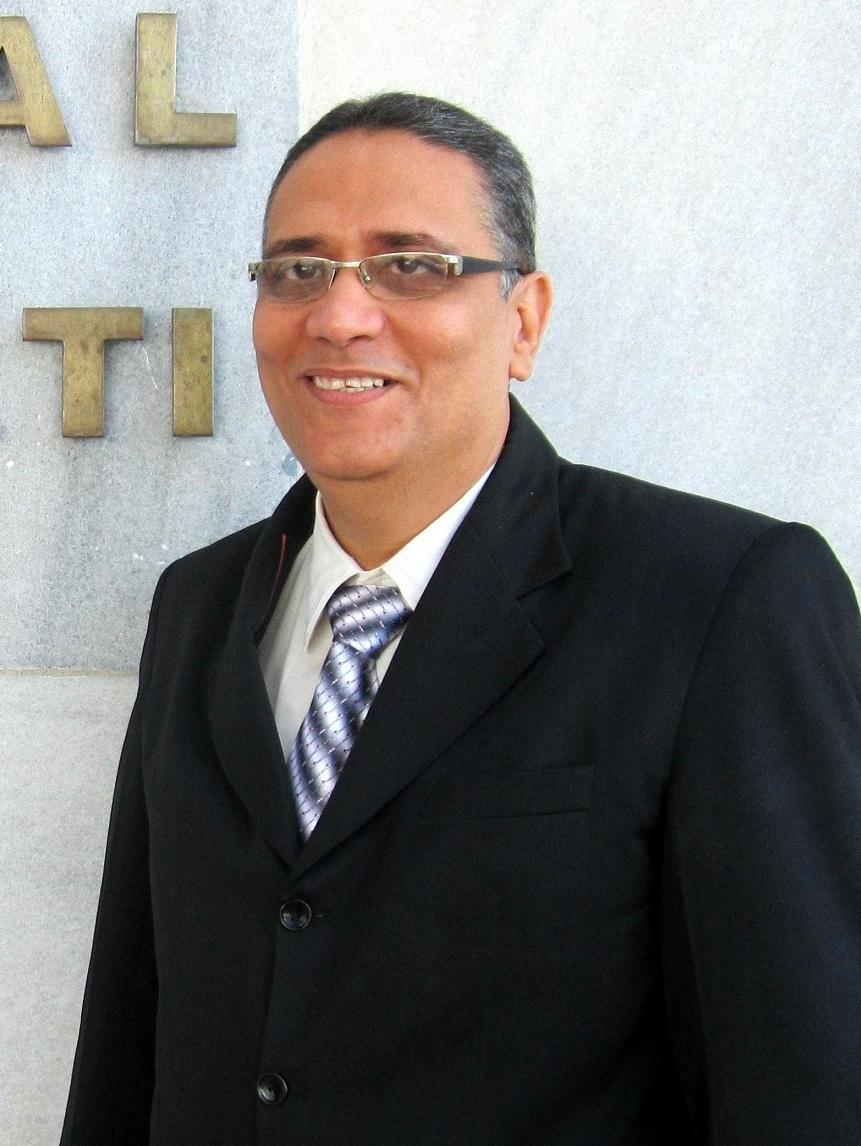
- Born: Javier Perez-Capdevila; February 7, 1963 (age 63); Guantanamo, Cuba
- Education: Ph. D. Economic Sciences
- Alma mater: University of Oriente (Cuba)
- Awards: Order "Carlos J. Finlay"; National Award of the Academy of Sciences of Cuba; Commemorative stamp "Antonio Bachiller Morales"; Stamp "Builders of the Future" for Personalities of Science
- Scientific career
- Fields: Applied mathematics, management, economy and econometrics, fuzzy sets
- Workplaces: Ministry of Science, Technology and Environment (Cuba)

Javier Perez-Capdevila (born February 7, 1963) is a Cuban scientist, mathematician and professor, whose research involves fuzzy sets and fuzzy mathematics.

== Awards and distinctions ==
- National Prize of the Academy of Sciences of Cuba, which is the highest Prize awarded by the Academy of Sciences of Cuba to Cuban scientists for relevant results with manifest impacts.
- Order (distinction) "Carlos Juan Finlay": It is the greatest scientific recognition granted in Cuba. This award is conferred by the State Council of the Republic of Cuba to Cuban and foreign citizens in recognition of extraordinary merits for valuable contributions to the development of Natural or Social Sciences, to scientific or research activities that have contributed exceptionally to the progress of the sciences and for the benefit of humanity.
- Commemorative Seal “Antonio Bachiller y Morales”: The highest award granted by the Cuban Society of Information Sciences for relevant contributions to Knowledge Management, both in the field of theory and in practice.
- Honorary Seal "Forgers of the Future": Awarded by the National Presidency of the Technical Youth Brigades of Cuba in an exceptional way to outstanding personalities of science.
- Distinction Juan Tomás Roig, for more than 30 years of services, in recognition to the merits reached like worker linked to the scientific chore in several branches of the economy and of the social life of the country.
- Honorary title (academic) of Professor of the COMFENALCO Foundation of Colombia.
