= Treaty of Montevideo =

There have been several treaties signed in Montevideo such as:

- 1828 Treaty of Montevideo in which Brazil and Argentina recognized the independence of Uruguay, after British mediation.
- Any of the treaties signed during the South American Congress of Private International Law of 1888-1889 or the South American Congress of Private International Law of 1939-1940 in Montevideo.
- 1890 Treaty of Montevideo signed between Argentina and Brazil to solve the so-called question of Palmas.
- 1960 Treaty of Montevideo established the Latin American Free Trade Association (LAFTA).
- 1979 Treaty of Montevideo (Act of Montevideo) signed between Chile and Argentina to allow the Papal mediation in the Beagle conflict.
- 1980 Treaty of Montevideo transformed LAFTA into Latin American Integration Association (ALADI).

== See also ==
- Montevideo Convention
