= Convention on the Exercise of Liberal Professions of 1889 =

1889 international treaty

Convention on the Exercise of Liberal Professions
- Type: Validation of foreign degrees treaty
- Context: First South American Congress of Private International Law
- Signed: February 4, 1889
- Location: Montevideo, Uruguay
- Condition: Its approval had to be communicated to the governments of Argentina and Uruguay and notified by the latter to the other parties to become effective
- Signatories: Argentina; Bolivia; Paraguay; Peru; Uruguay
- Ratifiers: Argentina; Bolivia; Colombia (adhesion); Ecuador (adhesion); Paraguay; Peru; Uruguay
- Depositary: Ministry of Foreign Relations (Uruguay) (original document), Governments of Uruguay and Argentina (ratifications)
- Language: Spanish

The Convention on the Exercise of Liberal Professions of 1889 (Spanish: Convención sobre el Ejercicio de Profesiones Liberales de 1889) is a treaty signed in the First South American Congress of Private International Law of 1889 in Montevideo, by which allows holders of an academic degree obtained in a public education institution of a state party to automatically validate their degrees in another state party without any requirement other than displaying the degree and prove that its owner is the one who is asking the validation. This treaty binds Argentina, Bolivia, Colombia, Ecuador, Paraguay, Peru and Uruguay.

== Parties ==
State	Signed	Approved	Deposit	Effective
Argentina	4 February 1889	11 December 1894 (Law No. 3192)	11 December 1894 (ratification)	Yes. Without effect in connection with Paraguay and Uruguay due to 1939 Convention.
Bolivia	4 February 1889	17 November 1903 (Law from 17 Nov 1903)	17 November 1903 (ratification)	Yes
Brazil	(attended the Congress but did not sign)	26 June 1890 (subject to later ratification)	(it was not ratified)	No
Colombia	(did not attend the Congress)	15 September 1917 (Law No. 5/1917)	19 October 1917 (adhesion)	Yes
Ecuador	(did not attend the Congress)	22 May 1928	16 December 1932 (adhesion)	Yes
Paraguay	4 February 1889	3 September 1889 (Law from 3 Sep 1889)	3 September 1889 (ratification)	Yes. Without effect in connection with Argentina and Uruguay due to 1939 Convention.
Peru	4 February 1939	4 November 1889 (Legislative Resolution from 4 Nov 1889)	4 November 1889 (ratification)	Yes
Uruguay	4 February 1889	3 October 1892 (Law No. 2207)	3 October 1892 (ratification)	Yes. Without effect in connection with Argentina and Paraguay due to 1939 Convention.
