= Convention on the Exercise of Liberal Professions of 1939 =

1939 international treaty in South America

Convention on the Exercise of Liberal Professions
- Type: Validation of foreign degrees treaty
- Context: Second South American Congress of Private International Law
- Signed: August 4, 1939
- Location: Montevideo, Uruguay
- Condition: For each signatory country upon deposit of its instrument of ratification in accordance with article 5 of the Convention
- Signatories: Argentina; Bolivia; Paraguay; Peru; Uruguay
- Ratifiers: Argentina; Paraguay; Uruguay
- Depositary: Ministry of Foreign Relations (Uruguay)
- Language: Spanish

The Convention on the Exercise of Liberal Professions of 1939 (Spanish: Convención sobre el Ejercicio de Profesiones Liberales de 1939) is a treaty signed in the Second South American Congress of Private International Law of 1939 and 1940 in Montevideo, by which allows holders of an academic degree obtained in a public education institution of a state party to validate their degrees in another state party provided that the degree keeps a reasonable equivalence with the corresponding one in the second state. This treaty updates the provisions of the Convention on the Exercise of Liberal Professions of 1889, and binds Argentina, Paraguay and Uruguay.

== Parties ==
State	Signed	Approved	Deposit	Effective
Argentina	4 August 1939	26 January 1963 (Decreto-Ley N° 468/1963)	29 March 1963 (ratification)	Yes
Bolivia	4 August 1939	(not approved)	-	No
Paraguay	4 August 1939	19 July 1955 (Ley N° 266/1955)	29 January 1958 (ratification)	Yes
Peru	4 August 1939	(not approved)	-	No
Uruguay	4 August 1939	22 December 1942 (Decreto-Ley N° 10272)	22 December 1942 (ratification)	Yes
