= Bustamante Code =

1928 multilateral treaty

Convention on Private International law
- Signed: 20 February 1928
- Location: Havana, Cuba
- Effective: November 1928
- Condition: Ratification by 2 states
- Signatories: 20
- Parties: 16: Bahamas; Bolivia; Brazil; Chile; Costa Rica; Cuba; Dominican Republic; Ecuador; El Salvador; Guatemala; Haiti; Honduras; Nicaragua; Panama; Peru; Venezuela
- Depositary: Ministry of State of Cuba (original instrument); Pan-American Union (ratifications)
- Languages: Portuguese, French, English, Spanish

The Bustamante Code (Spanish: Código de Derecho Internacional Privado) is a treaty intended to establish common rules for private international law in the Americas. The common ideas of the treaty were developed by Antonio Sánchez de Bustamante y Sirven and solidified during the Sixth Pan-American Conference, held in Cuba in 1928, with the Treaty of Havana being attached as an annex to the Bustamante Code.

The treaty was not widely accepted. The United States withdrew in the middle of negotiations. Mexico and Colombia did not sign it. Argentina, Uruguay, and Paraguay decided to abide by the rules of the Treaties of Montevideo with regard to private international law. The countries that ratified it did so with large reservations. The treaty is a set of rules that seeks to regulate the legal relations of foreign trade among the countries party to the treaty. The previously mentioned reservations cover many of the states' discretion on the use of the code in cases that contradicted the countries' domestic legislation and so its actual purposes are distorted.
