= Havana Bar Association =

Association of lawyers in Havana

- Type: Legal society
- Headquarters: Havana
- Location: Cuba

The Havana Bar Association (Spanish: Colegio de Abogados de la Habana), founded in the 19th century, was a legal institution of lawyers and law students in Havana, the capital of Cuba.

== History ==
The Havana Bar Association was founded in Havana, Cuba in the 19th century.

The governing body of the Havana Bar Association comprised a dean, six deputies, a treasurer, and a secretary. Vidal Morales y Morales was the founding secretary. The association held an annual meeting to discuss the administration's report.

Following the Cuban Revolution in 1959, the bar association was disbanded, and a usurping group of Communist dissident lawyers forcibly took over its offices on July 5, 1960. These pro-Castro lawyers also took over the Board of the Bar Association. With its headquarters occupied by the militia, the original Governing Board of the Bar Association of Havana continued to meet secretly until forced to continue from exile. By 1962, several hundred members of the association sought refuge in the United States.

== Deans ==
- Antonio Sánchez de Bustamante y Sirven (1913–1923)
- Manuel Fernandez Supervielle (1941)
- José Miró Cardona (1955)
- Osvaldo Dorticós (1958)
