= Manuel Sanguily Garritte =

Cuban independence activist and patriot (1848–1925)

Manuel Sanguily
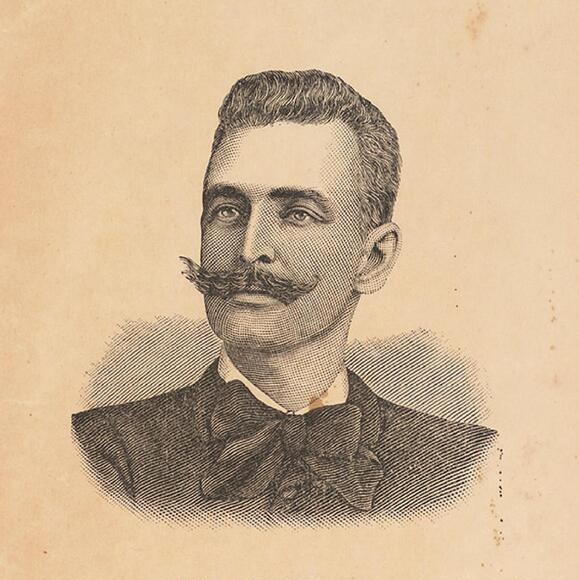

Minister of Foreign Affairs
- In office 28 January 1909 – 20 May 1913
- President: José Miguel Gómez
- Constituency: Republic of Cuba

President of the Senate of Cuba
- In office 5 April 1905 – 11 April 1906
- Preceded by: Domingo Méndez Capote
- Succeeded by: Ricardo Dolz Arango

Personal details
- Born: Manuel Sanguily y Garritte; March 26, 1848 Havana, La Habana Province, Captaincy General of Cuba, Spanish Empire
- Died: January 23, 1925 (aged 76) Havana, Cuba
- Relations: Julio Sanguily (brother)

Military service
- Allegiance: Republic of Cuba
- Branch/service: Cuban Liberation Army
- Rank: Brigadier general
- Battles/wars: Ten Years' War

Manuel Sanguily (March 26, 1848 – January 23, 1925) was a Cuban statesman, independence activist, historian, and patriot who participated in the Ten Years' War.

== Biography ==
=== Early life ===
Manuel Sanguily y Garritte was born on March 26, 1848, in Havana, La Habana Province, Spanish Cuba. He was the younger brother of Julio Sanguily.

Sanguily was educated in his early years at the El Salvador school under the mentorship of José de la Luz y Caballero.

=== Ten Years' War ===
From the United States, the Sanguily brothers landed in Camagüey Province on the Galvanic expedition led by Manuel de Quesada in December 1868. Manuel Sanguily and nine other patriots managed to land on Cayo Romano, crossed by canoe to La Guanaja, and enlisted in the mambises infantry.

He served as a colonel in the Cuban Liberation Army during the Ten Years' War (1868–1878). Before the war's end, Manuel left the island with his brother Julio in 1876, departing to the United States.

In April 1886, he published the text Habana while in Matanzas. After freedom of the press was implemented in Cuba in 1891, Sanguily expressed his separatist views in the Cuban press. In 1893, he published his widely known work Hojas Literarias.

=== Cuban War of Independence ===
Sanguily, who did not fight in the war of 1895, dedicated himself to journalism during his time in exile in the United States. Sanguily addressed a gathering of Cubans at Chickering Hall in New York City on May 19, 1896, in commemoration of José Martí's first death anniversary.

=== U.S. occupation of Cuba ===
In December 1898, Col. Manguily joined a Cuban delegation headed by Gen. Calixto García who met U.S. President William McKinley in Washington. McKinley used the meeting to address severance pay for the Cuban Liberation Army following the Spanish–American War.

Sanguily represented Cuba at the First Hague Peace Conference in The Hague, Netherlands, which concluded on July 29, 1899.

Appointed by the Military Governor of Cuba Leonard Wood's government, Manuel Sanguily became a professor of Rhetoric and Poetic Art at the Institute of Secondary Instruction of Havana on December 16, 1899. He was also named the institute's director.

On February 16, 1900, American Chief of Staff Adna Chaffee announced that Sanguily had been appointed to a commission to formulate rules and regulations for municipal elections.

When Governor Leonard Wood introduced the Platt Amendment in March 1901, Sanguily proposed a new election for the public to vote on Cuba–United States relations and elect delegates to discuss the amendment. On September 28, 1901, Gen. Máximo Gómez led a manifesto, signed by Sanguily, Domingo Méndez Capote, Gonzalo de Quesada, and others, promoting the election of Tomás Estrada Palma before the 1901 Cuban general election.

Manuel Sanguily was elected as a senator of Matanzas on February 24, 1902. In 1902, a teacher certification guide in Cuba included contributions from Sanguily, Vidal Morales y Morales, Nicolás Heredia, Carlos de la Torre, Manuel Valdés Rodríguez, and Esteban Borrero. The Board of Superintendents of Public Schools of the Island of Cuba approved it on November 25, 1903.

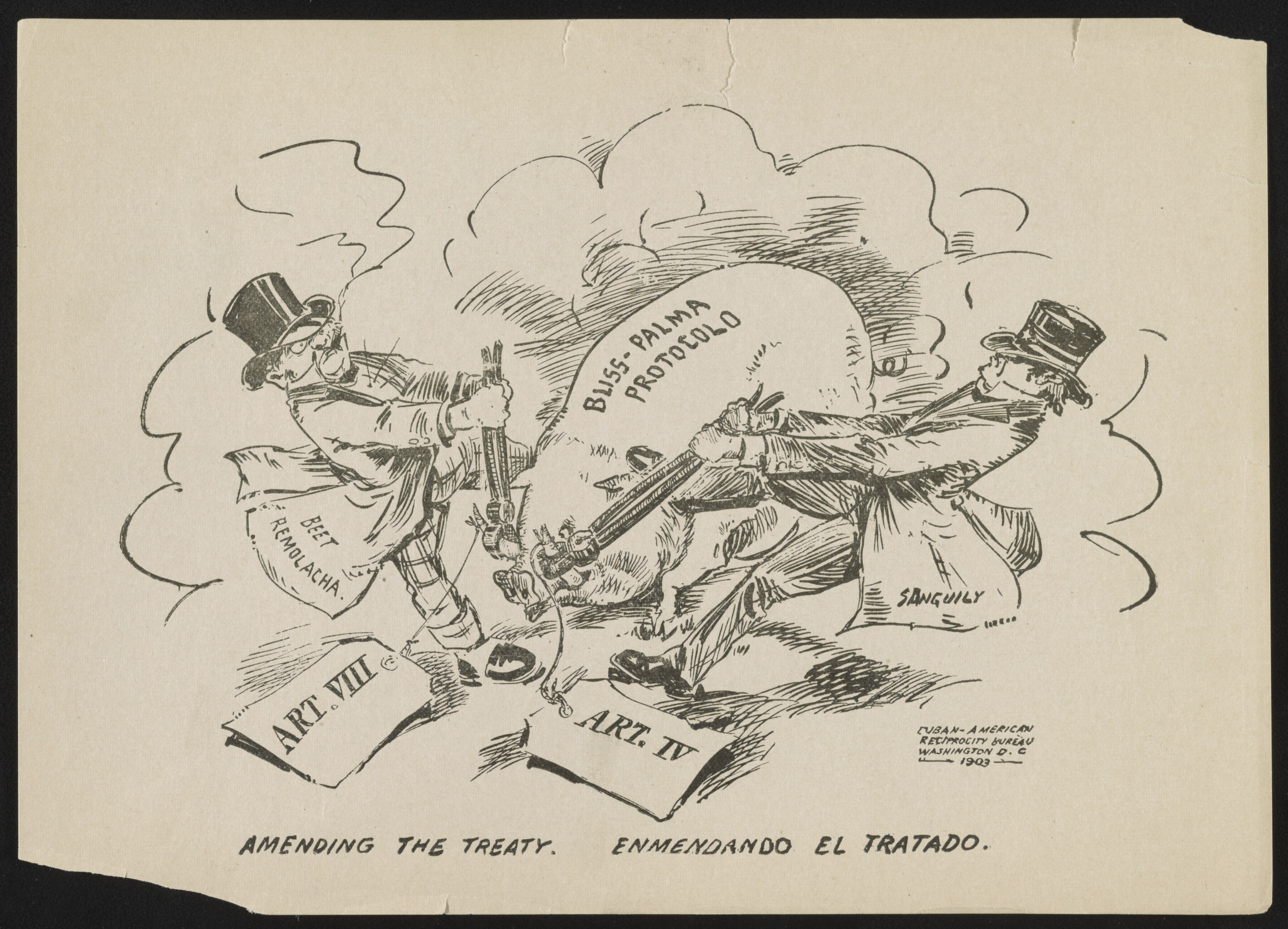
Amending the treaty (Spanish: Emmendando el tratado). Cuban-American Reciprocity Bureau. Washington, D.C., 1903.

In 1903, the president of the Republic of Cuba Tomás Estrada Palma appointed Manuel Sanguily as Cuban Secretary of State. He was involved in the Bliss-Palma protocol, which included various provisions on sugar tariffs in the proposed treaty between the United States and Cuba.

Sanguily was President of the Senate in the Congress of Cuba from April 5, 1905, to April 11, 1906.

September 1906, marked the beginning of the Second Occupation of Cuba. In 1907, he attended the Second Hague Peace Conference in The Hague, Netherlands, as a delegate of Cuba.

=== Secretary of State ===
Sanguily served as Minister of Foreign Affairs during the Gómez administration which began on January 28, 1909. On July 14, 1910, an extradition treaty between Cuba and Venezuela was signed in Havana and Manuel Sanguily was assigned as the plenipotentiary. He served as the principal official and Secretary of State of the Republic of Cuba to the U.S. Department of State. He opened negotiations with the U.S. Ambassador in Cuba for a revision of the 1902 Reciprocity Treaty in February 1911. Sanguily, acting as the Minister for Foreign Affairs of Cuba, made a speech at a banquet given by President Gómez to U.S. Secretary of State Philander Chase Knox, in Havana on April 11, 1912. Secretary Sanguily met Knox at the Hotel Telégrafo on April 13, 1912, to address pending issues, with Arthur M. Beaupre also present.

==== War of 1912 ====
Amid the War of 1912, Sanguily, as Secretary of the Interior (Spanish: Secretaría de Gobernación), called for volunteers on May 23, 1912, registering 280 men at Castillo de Atarés in Havana to suppress the movement.

He was named to the Commission of Statistics by President Gomez before the 1912 Cuban general election and appointed by President Mario García Menocal to be Inspector General of the Cuban National Army with the rank of brigadier general.

== Death ==
Manuel Sanguily died on January 23, 1925, in Havana, Cuba.

== Honors ==
Following his death, a city and sugarmill in Pinar del Río, Cuba was named after him. A stamp series was released on January 27, 1949, to celebrate the 100th anniversary of Manuel Sanguily.
