= Pan-Americanism =

Cooperation of the states of the Americas

The Americas

Pan-Americanism is a pan-nationalist movement that seeks to create, encourage, and organize relationships, an association (a Union), and cooperation among the states of the Americas, through diplomatic, political, economic, and social means. The term Pan-Americanism was first used by the New York Evening Post in 1882 when referring to James G. Blaine's proposal for a conference of American states in Washington D.C., gaining more popularity after the first conference in 1889. Through international conferences, Pan-Americanism embodies the spirit of cooperation to create and ratify treaties for the betterment in the Americas. Since 1826, the Americas have evolved the international conferences from an idea of revolutionary Simon Bolivar to the creation of an inter-America organization with the founding of the Organization of American States.

== History ==
Following the independence of the United States of America in 1776 and the independence of Haiti in 1804, the struggle for independence after 1810 by the nations of Hispanic America evoked a sense of unity, especially in South America, where, under Simón Bolívar in the north and José de San Martín in the south, there were co-operative efforts. Francisco Morazán briefly headed a Federal Republic of Central America, a union between El Salvador, Panama, Honduras, and Nicaragua. Early South American Pan-Americanists were also inspired by the American Revolutionary War, in which a suppressed and colonized society struggled, united, and gained independence. In the United States, Henry Clay and Thomas Jefferson set forth the principles of Pan-Americanism in the early 19th century by advocating for Latin American independence, with Jefferson's Governor of Louisiana, James Wilkinson, suggesting an alliance between the independent nations of Mexico, Cuba, and Peru with the US against Napoleon and Spain. Soon after the Spanish American wars of independence drew to a close, in 1823, James Madison and the US government declared through the Monroe Doctrine a new policy concerning interference by Europe in the affairs of the Americas by stopping any future European conquest or reconquest of the newly independent Latin American countries.

In the 19th century, South American military nationalism came to the fore, making Pan-Americanism goals seemingly impossible for the Americans. Venezuela and Ecuador withdrew in 1830 from Gran Colombia, the Central American Federation collapsed in 1838 as the union fell into a civil war, Argentina and Brazil fought continually over Uruguay, all three combined in the Paraguayan War (1865–1870) to defeat Paraguay, and Chile defeated Peru and Bolivia in the War of the Pacific (1879–1883).

However, during that period, Pan-Americanism existed in the form of a series of Inter-American Conferences. These conferences were a passion project for Simon Bolivar, who wanted to create an international assembly that houses representatives from Spain's old colonies. On December 7, 1824, Bolivar invited the newly independent colonies of Spain, as well as the US and Brazil, to participate in an Assembly of Plenipotentiaries that would be held in Panama on June 22, 1826. However, only Mexico, Peru, Colombia, and Central America sent delegates to the congress, as the others sent delegates too late and Brazil was at war with Argentina. The US planned on sending delegates but one died before reaching and the other arrived too late for the assembly. The Panama Congress of 1824 ended with 31 treaties, including mutual defense between American nations, the abolition of slavery, commercial trade, and no foreign nation could impede on the sovereignty of another nation.

The following conference was not held until 1847 when fears of Spain retaking Ecuador and other former colonies prompted Latin American countries to do another congress in Lima, Peru. Only Colombia, Ecuador, Perú, Bolivia, and Chile sent representatives. Mexico and the US did not send delegates because of the Mexican–American War. The conference created four treaties, including mutual defense, reduced tariffs, and rules of war, but the congresses of the countries refused to ratify the treaties.

In 1856, the third congress was held in Santiago, Chile. Initiated by US expansionism after the US efforts to try and economically annex the Galapagos Islands from Ecuador and American William Walker's filibustering expedition in Nicaragua, which saw Walker bring back slavery to Nicaragua and made English its official language. On September 15, 1856, the Continental Treaty of Santiago sought to curb US expansion in Latin America, and was quickly signed by Ecuador, Peru, and other Latin American countries. 1856 also saw the Congress of Washington where US representatives to Mexico, Colombia, Costa Rica, Honduras, El Salvador, Guatemala, and Venezuela called for an alliance between all the countries south of the Rio Grande in Texas and secure aid for the fight against William Walker, though never ratified.

The last congress to be held before the first International Conference of American States was in Lima, Peru on November 12, 1864. Plans to assemble started in 1861 when Spain annexed the Dominican Republic and signed a treaty with France and England to send troops to Mexico to recollect their debts. The objective was to discuss defense, boundaries, commerce, mail services, population data, and how to settle conflicts with arbitration. While Bolivia, Peru, Colombia, Chile, Argentina, Venezuela Guatemala, Ecuador, and El Salvador all attended. Brazil, Mexico, Uruguay, Paraguay, Panama, Honduras, and Costa Rica did not. The congress wrote two treaties: The Treaty of Union and Alliance, which would create an alliance between the nine nations that participated, and the Treaty for the Conservation of Peace, which dealt with mandatory arbitration, reciprocal trade, navigation, and mail exchange. Like most of the congressional treaties, the latter went unratified by the states.

The first modern Pan-American gathering was the or First International Conference of American States held in 1889-90 at Washington D.C, which was first proposed by James G. Blaine. Blaine was an advocate for bringing peace to the Americas and wanted a strong commercial relationship between the Americas that would enable the US to compete with European manufacturers. All countries invited joined the conference, except for the Dominican Republic because a treaty of arbitration and commercial reciprocity between the United States and the Dominican Republic in 1884 was never ratified by the United States, leading the Dominican to state they were not at liberty to enter a new discussion. The delegates met on October 2, 1889, with Blaine’s introduction declaring that the United States believes in cooperation and friendship not force, and invited the delegates to go around the United States to see the real America, which the delegates accepted. Treaties for arbitration of disputes and adjustment of tariffs were adopted, and the Commercial Bureau of the American Republics, which later became the Pan-American Union, was established.

Subsequent meetings were held in various South American cities. In Mexico City (1901), Rio de Janeiro (1906), Buenos Aires (1910), and many more. In 1933, the seventh, and one of the most important conferences was held in Montevideo, Uruguay. The 30’s was filled with instability as the Stock Market Crash plummeted export prices, oppressive dictators, and brewing tensions between states. All 21 states sent their delegates, except for Costa Rica, who declined because they did not want to pay for a delegate in such a terrible economic time. The conference issued that the congress had to immediately sign five peace pacts, including the Kellogg Pact which would outlaw wars. The conference also brought up the Convention on the Rights and Duties of States treaty, which would not allow any state to intervene in the internal or external affairs of another state, and was adopted unanimously and countries quickly ratified it.

In the 20th century, US President Franklin Roosevelt embraced a robust formulation of Pan-Americanism during World War II through the establishment of the Office of the Coordinator of Inter-American Affairs. Following his Good Neighbor Policy, Roosevelt endeavored to foster the development of peaceful commercial and cultural relations between the American Republics through the skillful use of cultural diplomacy. FDR would also go on to say “the essential true qualities of a true Pan-Americanism must be the same as those which constitute a good neighbor.” After the Montevideo conference, he defined the new US policy as now being against armed intervention, ushering a new era of foreign policy towards Latin America.

The ninth conference held in Bogota, Colombia, in 1948, saw the creation of the Organization of American States (OAS) and the Pact of Bogota. The OAS aimed to strengthen peace, ensure peaceful disputes, organize common action against aggression, seek solutions to political and economic problems, and promote economic and social development throughout. The Pact of Bogota stated that states must resolve disputes peacefully and try to settle their disputes amongst themselves before taking it to the UN security council. The tenth conference in Caracas, Venezuela, in 1954, would be the last conference under the name Inter-American Conference, although the OAS continues to hold special meetings to discuss wars outside of the Americas or issues that have common interest to the member states. The OAS has a general assembly that is similar to the one Inter-American conference had and met every five years, but updated this policy in 1971 to meet once a year.

== Evolution ==
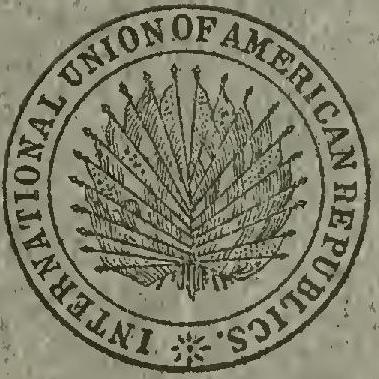
Emblem that was already used in Pan-Americanism in 1909

The intended liberalization of commercial intercourse did not occur, but collaboration was extended to a series of areas, such as health (Pan-American Health Organization, established 1902), geography and history (Pan-American Institute of Geography and History, 1928), child protection and children's rights (International American Institute for the Protection of Children, 1927), rights of the woman (Inter-American Commission of Women, 1928), indigenous policies (Inter-American Indigenist Institute, 1940), agriculture (Inter-American Institute of Agricultural Sciences), collective continental defense (Inter-American Treaty of Reciprocal Assistance, 1947), economic aid (Inter-American Development Bank, 1959), infrastructure works (Pan-American Highway) and peacekeeping (the Inter-American Peace Force after the invasion of the Dominican Republic, 1965), and human rights (Inter-American Court of Human Rights, 1979).

The American states also adopted a series of diplomatic and political rules, which were not always respected or fulfilled, governing relations between the countries like arbitration of disputes, peaceful resolution of conflicts, military non-intervention, equality among the member states of each organism, and in their mutual relations, decisions through resolutions approved by the majority, the recognition of diplomatic asylum, the Private International Law Code (Bustamante Code, 1928), the inter-American system of human rights (American Declaration of the Rights and Duties of Man, 1948; Inter-American Commission on Human Rights, 1959; and the 2001 Inter-American Democratic Charter of the Organization of American States).

== Pan-Americanism and the Monroe Doctrine ==
Serving as a core principle of U.S. foreign policy in the 1800s, United States President James Monroe announced in 1823 the establishment of the Monroe Doctrine, which implied that any further imperial actions into the Western Hemisphere by European countries would be unilaterally opposed by the United States. Subjugation under former imperial and colonial rule was a shared experience for most American nations, and this formed an important pillar of the Monroe Doctrine and consequently Pan-Americanism, where there was relatively unified opposition toward further inward imperial conquest by European nations.

Although the Monroe Doctrine originally declared U.S. opposition to new European expansion in the Americas, the United States used its increased influence in the region to promote its own strategic interests. Throughout the 1800s, the Monroe Doctrine was invoked multiple times in the Americas, including during the annexation of Texas (1845), the Mexican-U.S. War (1845–1848), and the 1861 Spanish Invasion of Santo Domingo. In almost all cases, U.S. influence increased in the region and the U.S. government's policy toward Latin America became more expansionist in nature.

In 1904, President Theodore Roosevelt added a "Corollary" to the Doctrine, which would later become known as the Roosevelt Corollary. Under this new interpretation of the Monroe Doctrine, opposition to European expansion continued, but in the event of "bad behavior" on the part of Latin American countries, "is was [now] the obligation of the United States to intervene in order to prevent European action."

Meanwhile, U.S. diplomats were also pursuing a contrasting policy of Pan-Americanism—a political movement that sought to promote the respect of national sovereignty, continental cooperation and further integration. These conflicting foreign policy objectives launched by the U.S. government created intense discourse among U.S. and Latin American leaders regarding hemispheric anti-interventionist policies and doctrines at future Pan-American Conferences.

Despite the push by U.S. diplomats for further integrated and unified American continents, the U.S. government countered attempts by Latin Americans to enshrine the principles behind the Monroe Doctrine and Corollary in international law, instead favoring a form of American (United States) exceptionalism that allowed continued intervention by the United States in Latin American affairs to protect U.S. interests. While many Latin American countries and intellectuals immediately criticized the Corollary and viewed U.S. foreign policy regarding national sovereignty as hypocritical, Washington continued to push back against any formal attempts by countries in Latin America to establish a standard interpretation of the Monroe Doctrine and its Corollary—that is, any attempt to "Pan-Americanize" the Monroe Doctrine and apply national sovereignty rights equally to all countries in the Americas.

== Latin American Responses to the Monroe Doctrine ==
During and after their wars of independence, the Latin American countries would look towards Europe, mostly Great Britain, for aid, but still feared colonization or recolonization by European powers. After the Monroe Doctrine was announced in December 1823, there was some mixed reception among the Latin American countries. It took Mexico City two months to respond, saying the United States intended on defending and maintaining the independence of Mexico and South America and they happily approved this message. Although rarely referenced after that, Mexico was still grateful that the US was trying to defend their sovereignty from Europe.

The Federal Republic of Central America also barely responded to the doctrine, only acknowledging that the US and Great Britain had recognized their independence and would protect them from European countries trying to conquer them, and acknowledging that the US has some special interests in Latin America, but still wants it to be independent. Though their responses to Monroe Doctrine may show a neutral or mild approval of the doctrine.

Haiti, gaining its independence from France in 1804 through a slave revolt, was not recognized by the US government and therefore it was believed that the US would not invoke the Monroe Doctrine if Haiti were invaded. Haiti responded by congratulating the US for extending its hand to Latin America and creating better relations with them. However, still discontent that the US hadn’t recognized Haiti, they continued by saying Haiti is no different than any republics in Latin America, it was as or more stable than other countries, and have proven their strength and sovereignty through terrible conflicts.

Vice President of Colombia, Francisco de Paula Santander, was very friendly towards the US, calling them Colombia’s powerful ally and grateful that the US was taking a high stand to protect Latin America. Though, like most Latin American countries, they predicted that it would be Great Britain primarily championing the rights of the American countries with the US being a secondary aid.

Chile was one of the countries to be displeased with the doctrine, saying that the doctrine wasn’t going to help anyone but the US. Brazil and the United Provinces of Rio de la Plata also had mixed feelings about the doctrine as Brazil was not officially recognized by the US and the United Provinces and conflicting views about if it was good or bad.

Simon Bolivar also was opposed to the Monroe Doctrine, saying that it would not help Pan-Americanism as it would be used as a tool by the US to expand and dominate the Americas. Although the doctrine would support the independence of Latin American countries, Bolivar believed the doctrine would also benefit the US’s interests.

== Economic impact ==
In 2019, 15.1 and 14.6 percent of all US imports were exchanged with Canada and Mexico, respectively. A significant portion of these imports involved food products. At 76%, the vast majority of all Canadian exports in 2021 were shipped South into the United States. Of these exports, goods such as lumber, automotive and aircraft components, aluminum, wheat, and vegetable oils were among the top exported commodities. Similarly, 76.4% of all Mexican exports, such as computers, cars, and crude petroleum, were destined for the United States. In 2017, 12 and 10 percent of all US exports were exchanged with Canada and Mexico, respectively.

== Congresses and conferences ==
- 1826 in Panama. Congreso Anfictiónico de Panamá Congress of Panama. Organized by Simón Bolívar.
- 1847–1848 Congreso de Lima
- 1856–1857 Congreso de Santiago
- 1864–1864 Congreso de Lima
- 1889/90 in Washington D.C. International Conference of American States. The day of this meeting, 14 April, has been celebrated since 1930 as Pan American Day.
- 1901/02 in Mexico City
- 1906 in Rio de Janeiro
- 1910 in Buenos Aires
- 1922 in Baltimore, Maryland Pan-American Conference of Women.
- 1923 in Santiago, Chile
- 1928 in Havana
- 1933 in Montevideo
- 1936 in Buenos Aires (Peace Conference)
- 1938 in Lima
- 1942 in Rio de Janeiro (conference of Ministers of Foreign Affairs)
- 1948 in Bogotá
- 1949 founded Office of Latin American Education, which became the Organization of Ibero-American States
- 1954 in Caracas
- 2nd Latin American Congress of Education took place in Quito
- 1967 Buenos Aires
- 1969 Viña del Mar
- 2005 Panama City, Panama – Congreso de Escritores y Escritoras de Centroamérica to create the Federación Centroamericana. Sponsored by the Asociación de Escritores de Panamá.
- 2006 Panama City, Panama – Sponsored by the President of Panama, Martín Torrijos – Latin American and Caribbean Congress in Solidarity with Puerto Rico's Independence

== See also ==
- Latin America
- List of conflicts in the Americas
- North American Union
- 2008 South American diplomatic crisis
- Panhispanism
- Patria Grande
