= 1888 Ecuadorian presidential election =

- 1888
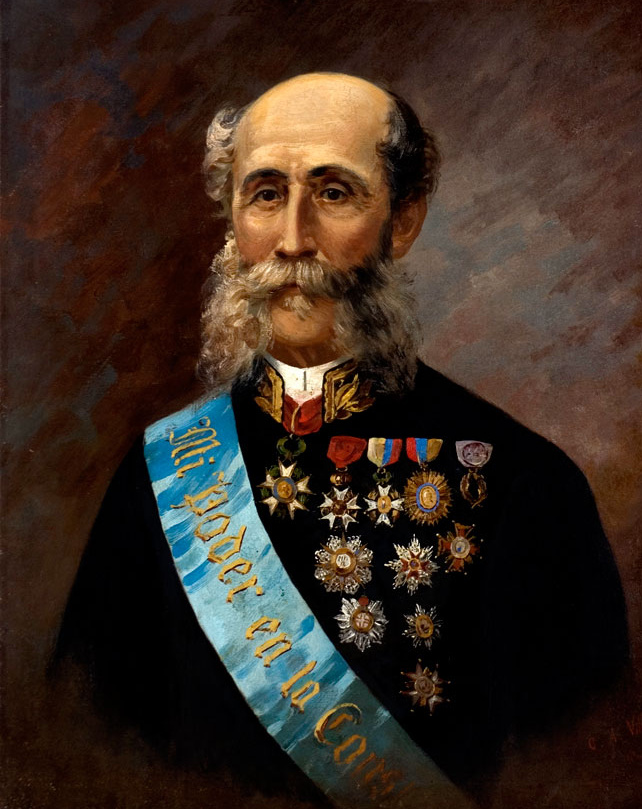

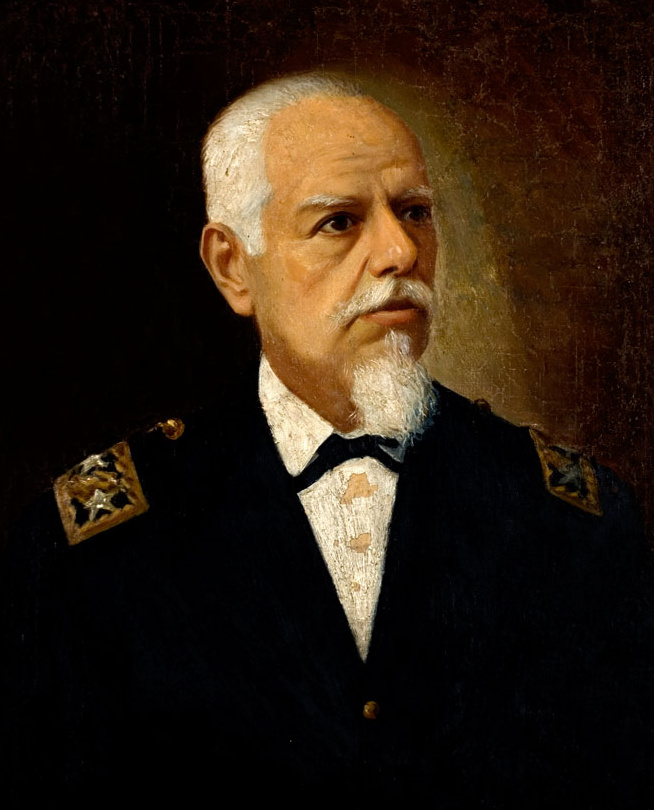
Nominee	Antonio Flores Jijón	Eloy Alfaro
Party	Progressive	Radical Liberal
Popular vote	29,555	777
Percentage	97.13%	2.55%
President before election
José Plácido Caamaño
Elected President
Antonio Flores Jijón

Presidential elections were held in Ecuador in 1888. The result was a victory for Antonio Flores Jijón, who received 97% of the vote. He took office on 1 July.

== Results ==
Candidate	Party	Votes	%
Antonio Flores Jijón	Progressive Party	29,555	97.13
Eloy Alfaro	Radical Liberal	777	2.55
Manuel Angel Larrea	Moderate Liberal	50	0.16
Pedro l. Lizarzaburo	Conservative Party	34	0.11
Francisco Salazar	Conservative–Progressive	7	0.02
Camilo Ponce Ortiz	Conservative Party	6	0.02
Total		30,429	100.00
Source: TSE
