= Columbus Memorial Library =

Library in Washington, D.C.

Coordinates: 38.892913°N 77.040374°W

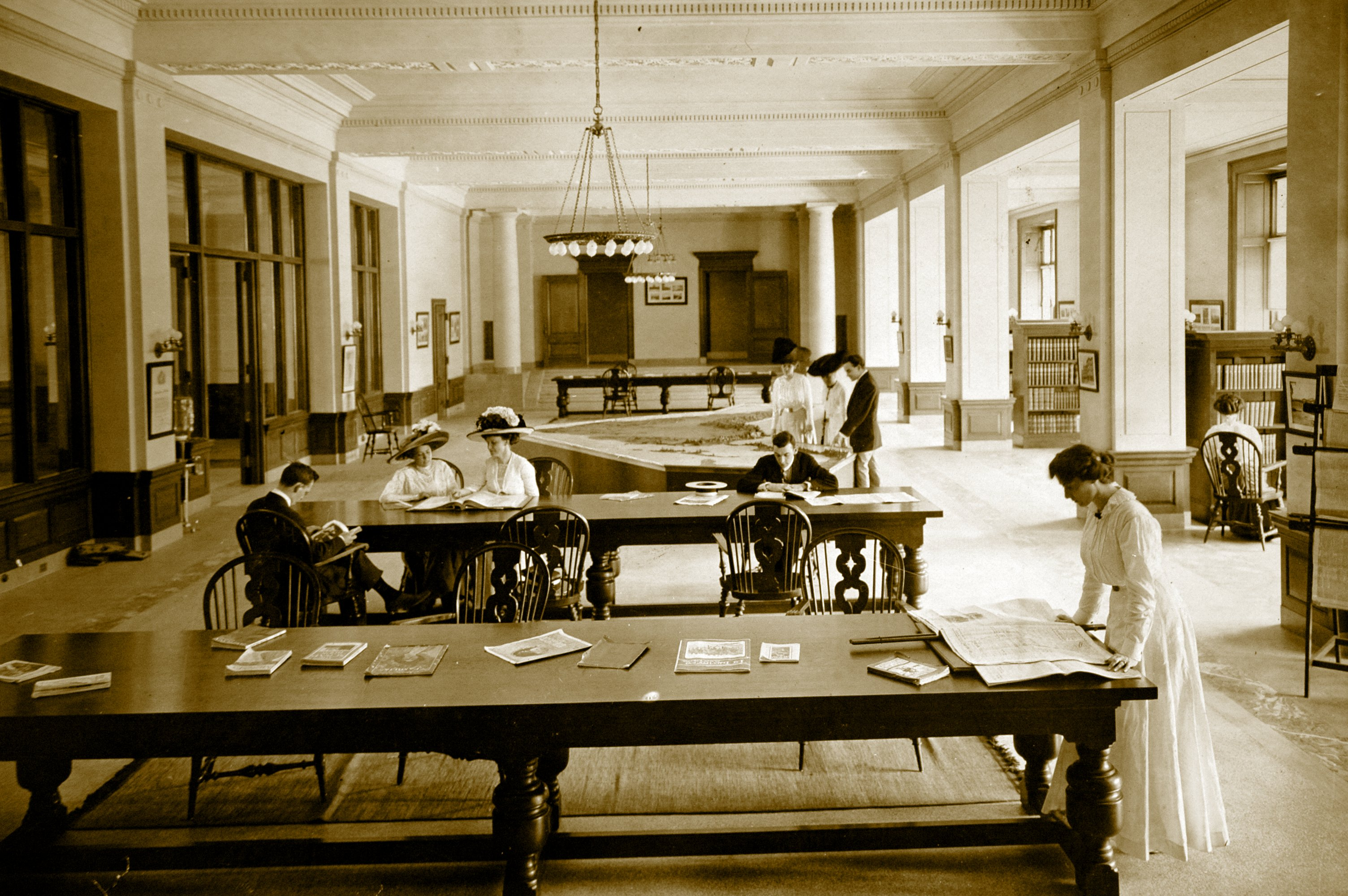
Reading Room of the Columbus Memorial Library in 1910 - Pan American Union Building

The Columbus Memorial Library is the library and archives of the Organization of American States (OAS) in Washington, D.C. The library offers an extensive collection of books and periodicals that date back to 1535.

OAS Seal
