= Nestor Ponce de León =

Cuban writer (1837–1899)

- Born: José Néstor Ponce de León y de la Guardia; February 26, 1837 Matanzas, Cuba
- Died: December 17, 1899 (aged 62) Habana, Cuba

Néstor Ponce de León (February 26, 1837 – December 17, 1899) was a Cuban author, editor, translator, publisher and bookseller.

== Early and personal life ==
Nestor Ponce de León was born in Matanzas, Cuba in 1837. Ponce de León graduated in 1858 in Jurisprudence on the Caribbean island. He married Antonia Carlota Bachiller y Govin, with whom he had five children: two sons, Néstor José Eusebio Ponce de León y Bachiller and Julio César Augusto Ponce de León y Bachiller, and three daughters, Maria Luisa Ponce de León y Bachiller, Carlota Rosabal Ponce de León y Bachiller, and Carlota Ponce de León y Bachiller.

In Cuba, Ponce de León contributed to and collaborated with numerous publications such as El Ateneo, El Correro De La Tarde, La Opinión y El Siglo, and helped fund others as well, including Brisas de Cuba, Joyas del Parnaso Cubano, and Revista critica de Ciencias, Literatura y Artes. These publications included revolutionary pamphlets in which Ponce de León defended the Yara Revolution, which resulted in the Cuban government issuing a warrant for his arrest. Ponce de León and his family fled to New York City in February 1869 and on January 21, 1875, he became a naturalized citizen of the United States of America.

== Life in exile in New York City ==
Ponce de León arrived in New York City on February 14, 1869. He became an important figure within that city's Cuban community. In New York, he initially established himself as a legal professional. He was the connector between the generation of La Guerra Grande, also known as the Ten Years' War, and the generation of José Martí, which helped to organize the Cuban War of Independence that began in 1895. He also founded the Revolutionary Central Board of Cuban emigrants, which brought together many compatriots dedicated to organizing for Cuban independence, including Martí himself (1853–1895). Martí made numerous references to Ponce de León in his works. Ponce de León was secretary of Junta Cubana, pushing Cuban national agendas in politic spheres. He also served as a notary and ran an influential Spanish-language bookstore and publishing house which produced elegant editions of Cuban literature and also published several of his own works. Also while in New York, he wrote for many Cuban newspapers and magazines, as well as directed El Educador Popular. He also served as a president of La Sociedad Literaria Hispano-Americana and a Chief Editor of Cubano del Exilio. As Chief Editor, Ponce de León published writings from various Latino authors like Luis Felipe Mantilla, Antonio Zambrana, and Jose Ignacio Rodriguez. In 1876, he established a library which had the largest collection of Latin American literature in the City at the time with 1,738 titles. Ponce de León's exile in the United States lasted 30 years.

Although Ponce de León had been sentenced to death in absentia by Spanish authorities in Cuba for his alleged war crimes, this sentence was never carried out. When Spain finally withdrew from Cuba after the U.S. intervention in 1898, Ponce de León was able to return to his homeland. Upon his return, he was named Director and Curator of the National Archives. He died on December 17, 1899, in Havana, Cuba.

== Publications ==
Ponce de León wrote about many topics, such as art and politics. One of his most notable works was the second edition of The Book of Blood published in 1873, where he wrote about the crimes Spaniards committed against Cuba and the search for Cuba's independence; the first edition was originally written by Jose Ignacio Rodriguez in 1871. Between 1871 and 1873, Ponce de León edited the magazine Museo de las Familias (Families Museum), which aimed at being both enjoyable and instructive for families. He also created Diccionario tecnologico ingles-espanol y espanol-ingles (Technological Dictionary, English-Spanish and Spanish-English) in 1893. This dictionary facilitated the translation of words in science, technology, and engineering from English to Spanish and vice versa. Also in that year, he published The Columbus Gallery: The Discoverer of the New World, a collection of representations of portraits, statues, monuments, medals, and paintings. He also wrote for La Revista Ilustrada de Nueva York (The New York Illustrated Magazine). In one of the articles of a column he wrote for the magazine, called "En mi biblioteca" ("In My Library"), he explicitly describes his personal library and talks about his friends and family who visited him.

== Family ==
Néstor Ponce de León, on November 12, 1858, in Havana, Cuba, married Antonia Ana Carlota Bachiller y Govín (born 1839), a daughter of Antonio Bachiller y Morales (1812–1889).

== Selected publications ==
| Year | Title | Printer | Compiler(s) | Google Books | HathiTrust | Internet Archive | Other |
|---|---|---|---|---|---|---|---|
| 1872 | Guía de la Ciudad de Nueva York Por Antonio Bachiller y Morales (1812–1889) | Néstor Ponce de León (José Néstor Ponce de León y de la Guardia; 1937–1899) (publisher); Manuel María Zarzamendi (1830–1891) (printer) (Note: Manuel María Zarzamendi (born around 1830 – died February 9, 1891 Córdoba, Veracruz, Mexico) was from La Victoria, Venezuela. He had been a typographer and journalist in Venezuela, then a printer and literary translator in New York, then printer publisher in Mexico. In Caracas, he had been editor of the publication, El Noticioso General, published twice a week. In 1858, the Federal War in Venezuela broke out. That same year, Zarzamendi became the first to introduce a steam powered printing press in Caracas. He immigrated to United States, arriving in New York City July 22, 1867. According to Jens Andermann (de) and William Rowe in their 2006 book, Images of Power: Iconography, Culture and the State in Latin America (Note 10, p. 75; Berghahn Books; OCLC 70845266), his wife was, as an artist, "relatively successful in commercial terms with her 'chromophotographic miniatures in oil.'") | Néstor Ponce de Leon (compiler) | | HathiTrust | Internet Archive | |
| 1893 | The Caravels of Columbus | Néstor Ponce de León (publisher); Caulon Press (printer) | Néstor Ponce de León (compiler); Translation revised by Frank L. Pavey | Google Books | | | |
