= José de la Luz y Caballero =

Cuban philosopher (1800–1862)

José Cipriano de la Luz y Caballero
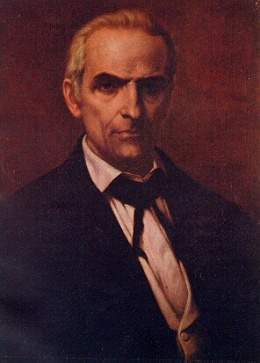
- Born: July 11, 1800; Havana
- Died: June 22, 1862 (aged 61); Havana
- Occupations: philosopher, scholar

José Cipriano de la Luz y Caballero (July 11, 1800 – June 22, 1862) was a Cuban scholar, acclaimed by José Martí as "the father ... the silent founder" of Cuban intellectual life of the 19th century. Interest in Luz's work was revived around the time of the Cuban Revolution, and new editions of his work published, as he was regarded as a wellspring of intellectual autonomy for the country.

Luz took his degree in philosophy in 1817 at the Real y Pontificia Universidad de San Gerónimo in Havana, and took a degree in law at the Seminario de San Carlos. From 1837 to 1841, he travelled extensively in North America and Europe, meeting a number of important intellectuals of the time, including Sir Walter Scott, Johann Wolfgang von Goethe, Georges Cuvier, the German philosopher Karl Krause, and the German naturalist Alexander von Humboldt. Krause paid a public tribute to Luz's scientific and philosophical views. With Humboldt, Luz arranged to establish a magnetic observatory in Cuba in correspondence with like institutions in Germany.

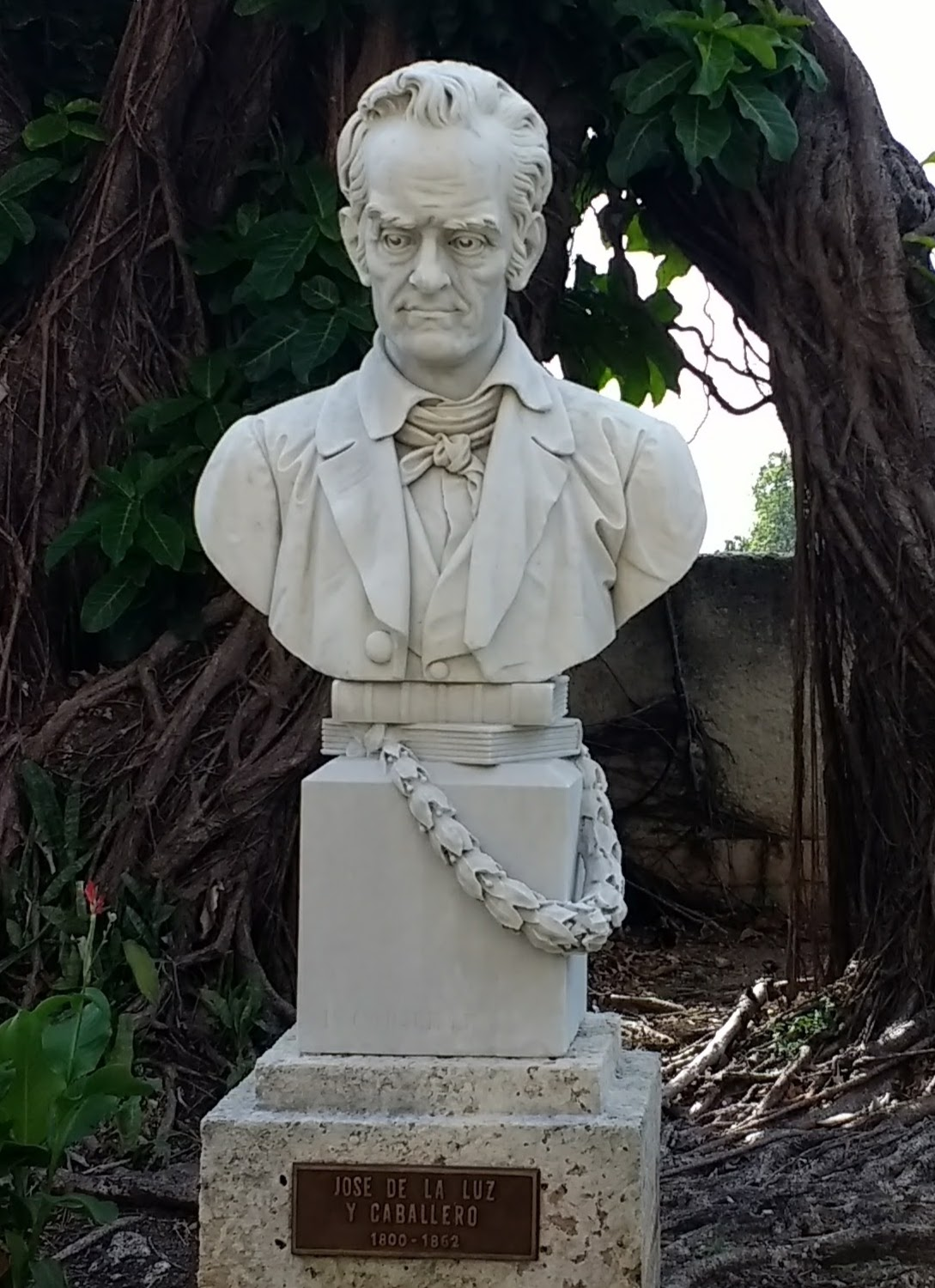
A bust of José de la Luz y Caballero on the grounds of the University of Havana campus.

Caballero is perhaps best known for his often quoted characterization of Humboldt, who travelled in Cuba in the early 19th century, as the "second discoverer" of the island, after Columbus: "Colón dio a Europa un Nuevo Mundo; Humboldt se lo hizo conocer en lo físico, en lo material, en lo intellectual y lo moral" ("Columbus gave Europe a New World; Humboldt made it known in its physical, material, intellectual, and moral aspects").

On November 29, 1831, de la Luz was visiting Venice, Italy, when he received a communication from Justo Yelez, director of the Seminario de San Carlos (San Carlos Seminary) in Havana, commissioning him to purchase the machines and devices required to study physics at the school. De la Luz accepted the commission and performed a thorough investigation of the subject; when he had concluded his task, he recorded his observations in an extensive letter addressed to Yelez, and upon the latter's receipt of them they were included in the number 6 issue of the Revista Bimestre Cubana (Cuban Bimonthly Magazine). "Neither in France, nor in England, nor in Germany," said de la Luz, "could have been found such a complete assortment of electro-magnetic devices, like that I acquired in Italy from the noble Italian gentleman from Modena."

On his return to Cuba in 1831, Luz devoted all his time and energies to the cause of education, assuming the directorship of a college from 1834 until 1839. In 1848 he founded the "El Salvador" school.

Among his works are a translation of Volney's Travels in Egypt and Syria, with notes and additions (Paris, 1829); Siegling's Public Prisons and their Reforms, from the German (1837); and numerous memoirs and pamphlets on educational, scientific, and philosophical subjects. There are several biographies of La Luz, one being that in Spanish by José Ignacio Rodríguez (New York, 1874).
