= First South American Congress of Private International Law =

1888–1889 International congress on Private International Law

The First South American Congress of Private International Law was an international congress on private international law (or conflict of laws) and an ad-hoc codifier forum of international conflict of laws treaties held in Montevideo from 25 August 1888 to 18 February 1889, in which eight treaties and an additional protocol were passed that covered practically all the subjects of conflicts of laws of that time. These were one of the first treaties on conflict of laws to come into force in the world.

== Invitation ==
On 14 February 1888 the Minister of Foreign Affairs of Argentina, Norberto Quirno Costa, and the Minister Plenipotentiary of Uruguay to Argentina, Gonzalo Ramírez, met in Buenos Aires in order to convene a congress of South American countries with the purpose of standardizing and unifying through a treaty the subjects related to private international law. The Congress on Private International Law would be organized by the governments of Argentina and Uruguay the next 25 August in Montevideo.

On 10 March 1888, Quirno Costa sent separated but simultaneous invitations to the governments of Bolivia, Brazil, Colombia, Chile, Ecuador, Paraguay, Peru and Venezuela.

Governments of Bolivia, Brazil, Chile, Paraguay and Peru accepted to the invitation. Government of Colombia declined the invitation because it was necessary to review the current legislation due to the recent reform of the Colombian Constitution, task that prevented it from attending the Congress since it would not be done before the beginning of the Congress. In the case of Ecuador, it declined the invitation because they were in the middle of elections, so there would be an imminent change of government functionaries, and the new functionaries should be the ones who select and sent representatives. Venezuelan government declined the invitation because "the narrow time" since they received it to the date of beginning of the Congress, and due to the distance their plenipotentiary would have to travel would make it impossible to attend.

== Congress ==
=== Attendants ===
Attended to the Congress Roque Sáenz Peña and Manuel Quintana as representatives of the Republic of Argentina, Santiago Vaca Guzmán as the representative of the Republic of Bolivia, Domingos de Andrade Figueira as the representative of the Empire of Brazil, Guillermo Matta and Belisario Prats as the representatives of the Republic of Chile, Benjamín Aceval and José Zacarías Caminos as the representatives of the Republic of Paraguay, Cesáreo Chacaltana and Manuel María Gálvez as the representatives of the Republic of Peru, and Ildefonso García Lagos and Gonzalo Ramírez as the representatives of the Oriental Republic of Uruguay.

In few of the first sessions attended as temporary representatives of Brazil the Baron of Alencar and Juan Duarte Da Ponte Ribeiro. The appointed Minister Plenipotentiary Domingos de Andrade Figueira joined in the 15th session of 10 December due to the successive extensions of the works of the Brazilian parliament.

=== Opening session ===
The opening session took place on 25 August 1888. Ildefonso García Lagos said in his opening speech that with the advance of the legal sciences it is already possible to create fixed rules that are able to resolve the conflicts caused by the application of its laws when dealing with private relations, without detriment to the sovereignty of nations.

He also added that the frequency and ease with international transactions occurs and the multiplicity and importance of the commerce that link the South American countries each other and to the rest of the world required to materialize an international agreement for the solution of issues that affect those legal relations.

Meanwhile, Norberto Quirno Costa mentioned that nationals and foreigners who join the country should not feel stranger to the system neither being harmed by the conflicts of laws in regard to their person, acts or properties, thus making civil relations easier. Also as the South American countries progress and their international relations increase, the links between people are narrower and the existence of common rules is more necessary.

However, in the 12th session of 1 December, on the occasion of the discussion of the project on international criminal law treaty introduced at the 7th session of 10 October, Sáenz Peña said that they attended the Congress not to standardize laws as expressed in the letter of invitation to the Congress, because this would imply reviewing domestic laws of each country, which would mean violating the principle of the inviolability of the States, but they were there to discuss the applicable law and the competent jurisdiction in a case with international elements.

He also said:

Estudiamos, Señores, una ciencia de relacion, que nace precisamente de esa diversidad de las legislaciones, á diferencia del derecho interno, que tiene una vida incondicional, que tiene una existencia propia que vive en todos los casos y contra todas las hipótesis; si suprimimos, entre tanto, como lo quiere Bluntschli, las fronteras que separan á los pueblos, si los confundimos por un momento en una sola nacionalidad, el Derecho Internacional Privado, habría desaparecido con la última soberanía local, con la última ley territorial...

Translation:

Gentlemen, we study a science of relation, that is born precisely from that diversity of legislations, unlike the domestic law, that has an unconditional life, has its own existence that lives in all cases and against all the hypotheses; meanwhile, if we suppress, as Bluntschli wants, the borders that separate the peoples, if we merge them for a moment in a single nationality, the Private International Law would have disappeared with the last local sovereignty, with the last domestic law...

== Treaties ==
=== Treaty on International Civil Law ===
This treaty deals with various subjects: capacity of physical and juridical persons, domicile, absence, marriage, parental authority, filiation, guardianship, property, legal acts, inheritance, prescription and jurisdiction.

The connecting factor chosen by the treaty regarding capacity is the domicile.

Regarding jurisdiction, title XIV regulates direct international jurisdiction. In its article 56 provides for action in personam shall be competent the judge of the State whose law regulates the legal act to be under trial. It also allows as a concurrent forum the judge of the domicile of the defendant.

On top of that general rule, the treaty provides specific solutions of jurisdiction according to the subject in question: for example, the judge of the domicile of the person (for cases of absence, capacity, parental authority and guardianship, marriage and its validity, personal effects, divorce, etc.), the judge of the location of property (for actions in rem, property of the persons lacking capacity, matrimonial property, hereditary property) or the judge of the place of residence (urgent measures for the personal relations of the marriage, and for minors and disabled people).

=== Treaty on International Commercial Law ===
In case of international insurance contracts, the judge of the legal domicile of the insurance companies or its branch offices has jurisdiction over lawsuits against them on terrestrial or marine insurance contracts. According to Boggiano, when the insurance company is the plaintiff, it could alternatively sue before the judge of the domicile of the defendant following article 56 of the Treaty on International Civil Law. Terrestrial or marine insurance contracts are regulated according to the law of the place where the property subject to the insurance policy is situated at the time when the contract was celebrated.

=== Treaty on International Procedural Law ===
Treaty on International Procedural Law of 1889 regulates subjects related to Procedural Law. Among its provisions, its first article establishes that the procedure and its incidents are governed by the law of the State where they are promoted (the principle lex fori regit processum). Its article 2 establishes that the admission and evaluation of the evidence are governed according to the law of the merits of the case.

Title II on legalization requires the legalization of judgments, awards and other authentic documents in order to take effect in another State party. In order to achieve that, legalization must be carried out in accordance with the laws of the State where it was issued and performed by the accredited diplomatic or consular agent of the State where the enforcement is to be sought.

Title III regulates issues related to the fulfilment of letters rogatory, judgments and foreign arbitral awards. For foreign judgments and arbitral awards issued in a State party, it establishes the general rule of recognition, subject to certain requirements: that the judgment or award has been issued by a competent court in the international sphere, that it is under res judicata in the State where it has been issued, that the proceeding followed due process and it does not go against the laws of public policy of the country where the recognition or enforcement is requested.

Article 6 lists the necessary documents to request the fulfilment of judgments and arbitral awards. Article 7 provides that the procedure for judgments and awards shall be determined by the procedural law of the State where the enforcement will be requested. Article 8 provides the extraterritorial validity of acts of non-contentious jurisdiction, in accordance with the rules of the preceding articles. Article 9 provides that letters rogatory whose purpose is a judicial proceeding shall be carried out provided they meet the requirements of the Treaty.

=== Treaty on International Penal Law ===
Treaty on International Penal Law, passed on 23 January 1889, deals with various subjects on the Penal Law matter, such as jurisdiction on criminal matters, asylum, extradition and precautionary arrest. Treaty was ratifier by Argentina in 1894 (by Law N° 3192), Bolivia in 1903 (by Law of 17 November 1903), Paraguay in 1889, Peru in 1889 (by Legislative Decision of 4 November 1889) and Uruguay in 1892 (by Law N° 2207).

In matters of penal jurisdiction, it provides that the crimes are judged by the courts of the State where they are committed, in accordance with their laws, regardless of the nationality of the alleged perpetrator, victim or affected. In the case, the crime has been committed in one State but its effects occur in another State, the court with jurisdiction and the applicable law will be those of the State where the harmful effects occurred. If the crime affected several States, the tribunal of the State where the offender has been captured will have jurisdiction on the case.

In the case of crimes committed in high seas or international waters, they are judged and indicted according to the law of the State of the flag of the vessel. Regarding crimes committed in territorial waters, in the case of war vessels, they are judged and indicted in accordance with the laws of the State of the flag of the vessel, while in the case of crimes committed in merchant vessels of one State in territorial waters of another one, will be judged and indicted according to the law of the State in whose territorial waters the vessel was lying at the time the crime was committed.

In matters of asylum, Title II of the Treaty regulates this subject, being this the first time in the world that codifies asylum in a treaty and also laid the groundwork for the later development of the subject in international law. Article 15 provides that no offender who has taken refuge in the territory of a State shall be surrendered to the authorities of another State unless in compliance with the rules of extradition. This protection from forcible return (non-refoulement) is extended by the provision of article 23, which provides that extradition shall not work in the case of political offences or common offences connected to political offences, to be determined by the requested State under the law most favorable to the accused.

Article 16 stipulates the inviolability of the political asylum, even though the State who granted the asylum has the duty to prevent the political refugee from committing acts within its territory which may endanger the public peace of the State in which the crime has been committed. This provision foresaw the principle that developed later, that the grant of asylum is a humanitarian, peaceful and non-political act, that should not be taken as unfriendly towards the country of origin.

About the diplomatic asylum, article 17 provides that the alleged offender of common crimes that seeks for asylum in a diplomatic office should be surrendered to the local authorities, by the head of that legation at the request of the Ministry of Foreign Relations or of his own motion. However, with political offenders, their asylum shall be respected, having the head of the legation the obligation to give notices of this situation to the government of the State to which is accredited, and on the other hand, this State may request to be sent away the offender out of its territory, and in turn, the head of the legation may require proper guarantees for the exit of the refugee out of the territory.

In matters of extradition, the Treaty stipulates the obligation of the States Party to return criminals taking refuge in its territory provided that the State requesting the extradition has jurisdiction in the case, that the nature or seriousness of the crime justifies handing over the offender, that the State requesting extradition provides documentary evidence that the laws of that State authorize the prosecution and imprisonment of the offender, that the crime has not prescribed according to the laws of the State requesting the extradition, and that the offender has not been condemned for the same crime and has not already completed his or her sentence (non bis in idem). Title IV deals with procedure of extradition.

=== Treaty on Literary and Artistic Property ===
The Treaty on Literary and Artistic Property, from the international point of view, is the first treaty that set up a copyright protection system in the Americas. Treaty stipulates that the copyright is regulated in accordance with the law of the State where the work was first published or distributed, also extending to the heirs. Regarding the duration of protection, the rule of the shorter term is stipulated, which means no state grants authors of another country a monopoly term greater than its own for its authors, and if the term of the country of origin is shorter, it may be limited to that term.

=== Treaty on Commercial and Industrial Trademarks ===
The Treaty on Commercial and Industrial Trademarks stipulates in its first article two rules: a substantial one, by which recognizes to any person who has been granted in one of the State parties the right to exclusively use a trademark, the enjoyment of the same trademark privilege in the other States parties; and another choice of law rule, which establishes that the law applicable to formalities and conditions of exercising that enjoyment will be that of the law of the country where the trademark is intended to be used.

The treaty defines trademark as "the sign, emblem or external name that the merchant or manufacturer adopts and applies to his or her merchandise and products, to distinguish them from those of other manufacturers or merchants who trade goods of the same kind". It also includes "industrial drawings" and "works that, through weaving or printing, are stamped on the product itself". It defines what comprises the property rights over a trademark: the use, transmission or its transfer.

Article 4 establishes international jurisdiction and the choice of law to start a lawsuit —civil and criminal— to prosecute counterfeiting or trademark adulteration: these will be judge before the courts of the State where the fraud was committed, according to its lex fori.

=== Treaty on Letters Patent ===
In its first article, the Treaty on Letters Patent of 1889 describes a substantive rule on intangible property, by which grants holders of a patent issued in any of the State parties the right of enjoying patent rights (which are those defined in article 5) in all State parties provided that its owner registers the patent in any of the other State parties within one year.

Choice of law rule of article 2 establishes the length of protection in accordance with the law of the State where the patent will be exercised. In the case the patent will be exercised in several countries, the length will be the corresponding one in each country. Finally, the term of privilege in a second country could be limited to one of the countries where it was issued.

Conflicts arising from priority of invention shall be resolved taking into account the dates of request of the patents in question in each of the related countries, in accordance with the substantive rule of article 3.

Its article 4 defines what is understood as invention or discovery: a new method, a mechanic or handheld device used to manufacture industrial products, to discover a new industrial product and the application of improved means in order to achieve results superior to those already known. It also describes what are not subject to obtain the right of patent.

Article 6 choice of law rule establishes that the civil and criminal liability for damage caused to the inventor rights is regulated under the law of the country where the damage was caused (lex loci delicti commissi).

=== Convention on the Exercise of Liberal Professions ===
The Convention on the Exercise of Liberal Professions rules that the holders of an academic degree obtained in a public education institution of a state party are allowed to automatically validate their degrees in another state party provided that the following requirements are fulfilled: the exhibition of the degree duly legalized and prove that its owner is the one who is asking the validation. According to Quintin Alfonsin, this treaty deals with the validation of academic degrees for a profession in another state party but not with the practice of that profession itself, the latter being regulated by the domestic law instead.

=== Additional Protocol to the Treaties on Private International Law ===
The Additional Protocol to the Treaties of 1889 is applicable to the other eight treaties and it regulated general subjects of private international law.

It establishes the application of foreign laws of the contracting countries depending on the specific case, regardless of whether the persons involved are national or foreign. It also provides that the judge must apply ex officio the law of the legal system referred by the choice of law rule, although granting the parties the opportunity to prove the existence and content of that law.

Furthermore, it establishes that all the appeals available in the procedural law of the place of the process may be used even if foreign law are to be applied in the case.

Its fourth article provides the international public policy exception, that works once the applicable law of the legal relationship referred by the choice of law rule has been determined, which a judge may invoke in a case to reject the application of that applicable law due to it infringes the legal system of the competent jurisdiction. This article was inspired by article 95 of the Draft Code of Private International Law of Gonzalo Ramirez.

== Signatories and ratifications ==
Treaty	Argentina	Bolivia	Brazil	Chile	Colombia (Note: Did not attend the Congress.)	Ecuador	Paraguay	Peru	Uruguay
Treaty on International Civil Law of 1889	Ratified	Ratified	No	No	Adhered	No	Ratified	Ratified	Ratified
Treaty on International Commercial Law of 1889	Ratified	Ratified	Signed	Signed	Adhered	No	Ratified	Ratified	Ratified
Treaty on International Procedural Law of 1889	Ratified	Ratified	Signed	Signed	Adhered	No	Ratified	Ratified	Ratified
Treaty on International Penal Law of 1889	Ratified	Ratified	No	No	No	No	Ratified	Ratified	Ratified
Treaty on Literary and Artistic Property of 1889 (Note: Other non-South American countries also adhered to this treaty: France in 1896, Spain and Italy in 1900, Belgium in 1903, Austria in 1923, Germany in 1925, and Hungary in 1931, adhesions effective with Argentina, Bolivia and Paraguay.)	Ratified	Ratified	Signed	Signed	No	No	Ratified	Ratified	Ratified
Treaty on Commercial and Industrial Trademarks of 1889	Ratified	Ratified	Signed	Signed	No	No	Ratified	Ratified	Ratified
Treaty on Letters Patent of 1889	Ratified	Ratified	Signed	Signed	No	No	Ratified	Ratified	Ratified
Convention on the Exercise of Liberal Professions of 1889	Ratified	Ratified	Adhesion subject to later ratification	No	Adhered	Adhered	Ratified	Ratified	Ratified
Additional Protocol to the Treaties on Private International Law of 1889	Ratified	Ratified	No	No	No	No	Ratified	Ratified	Ratified

== Bibliography ==
- Actas de las sesiones del Congreso Sud-Americano de Derecho Internacional Privado [Sessions' proceedings from the South American Congress of Private International Law] (PDF) (in Spanish). Imprenta de Juan A. Alsina. 1889.
- Boggiano, Antonio (2000). Curso de derecho internacional privado. Derecho de las relaciones privadas internacionales (in Spanish). Abeledo-Perrot. ISBN 978-950-20-1271-1.
- Fernández Arroyo, Diego P., ed. (2003). Derecho internacional privado de los estados del Mercosur (in Spanish). Zavalia. ISBN 978-950-572-626-4.
- Fresnedo de Aguirre, Cecilia (April 2004). Curso de Derecho Internacional Privado (in Spanish). Vol. Tomo I: Parte General (2nd ed.). Montevideo: Fundación de Cultura Universitaria. pp. 127–133, 146–148. ISBN 978-9974-2-0391-0. OCLC 56034181.
- Ramírez, Gonzalo (1888). Proyecto de Código de Derecho Internacional Privado y su comentario (in Spanish). Buenos Aires: Félix Lajouane, Ed. OCLC 934160826.
- Vescovi, Eduardo (2000). Derecho procesal civil internacional. Uruguay, el Mercosur y América (in Spanish). Montevideo: Ediciones Idea.
