= Julio Sanguily =

Cuban independence activist and patriot (1845–1906)

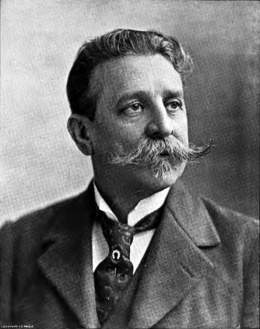
- Born: November 9, 1845; Havana, La Habana Province, Cuba
- Died: March 23, 1906 (aged 60); Havana, La Habana Province, Cuba
- Relatives: Gen. Julio Sanguily Echarte (son)
- Military career
- Allegiance: Cuba
- Branch: Cuban Liberation Army
- Conflicts: Ten Years' War; Cuban War of Independence

Julio Sanguily Garritte (1845–1906) was a Cuban independence activist and insurgent who took prominent roles in the rebel army during the Ten Years' War (1868–1878) and the Cuban War of Independence(1895–1898).

== Origins ==
Julio Sanguily Garritte was born in Havana on November 9, 1845, son to Julio Sanguily, a Frenchman from Haiti, and Mary Garritte, from Ireland.

His older brother, Guillermo, settled in the United States in 1862, and in Australia in 1872, where he died in 1909.

His younger brother, Manuel Sanguily, would participate with Julio in the Ten Years' War and in the preparations for the Cuban War of Independence.

== Ten Years' War ==
Departing from the U.S., he landed alongside his brother Manuel in Camagüey aboard the Galvanic in December 1868 in order to join the rebel forces.

After he was appointed brigadier, Sanguily was captured by the Spanish on October 8, 1871, and rescued by the forces of Major General Ignacio Agramonte the next day in what would later be known as the Rescue of Sanguily.

He reached the rank of major general of the Liberation Army of Cuba on May 1, 1872. In combat he was struck by a machete in a foot, being crippled for the rest of his life, despite which, he continued in the war. As a result of these injuries, his assistants had to help him mount and dismount the horse.

Before the war ended, he left the island with his brother Manuel in 1876 to recover from his injuries and to search for weapons and supplies in the United States.

== Interwar period and Cuban War of Independence ==
After the insurgent army capitulated in February 1878, he remained linked to the Cuban independence clubs in the United States. Over time, he renounced his Spanish citizenship and became a U.S. citizen. He participated in various conspiracies, including the failed conspiracy that is historically known as the Manganese Peace, which occurred in 1890, when the Spanish captain-general allowed Antonio Maceo into Cuba. Despite Maceo had given his word that his visit was purely personal, he tried to secure men, funds and weapons for a new uprising.

He could not participate in the Cuban War of Independence, as he was captured by the Spanish police in Havana on February 24, 1895. He was issued a life sentence on November 27, 1895, but since he was a U.S. citizen, the Cleveland administration intervened in his favour. The Spanish authorities granted him free passage to the U.S., where he was freed in exchange for not joining the insurgency. He was only released in 1898 and joined an expedition that landed in Cuba in late-May, bare seeing any action during the Spanish-American War.

=== Later years ===
After the Cuban Republic became a reality in 1902, he did not intervene in politics, nor did he hold public office, unlike his brother Manuel. He died in Havana on March 23, 1906, at the age of 60.
