= Antonio Bachiller y Morales =

Cuban lawyer, historian and bibliographer

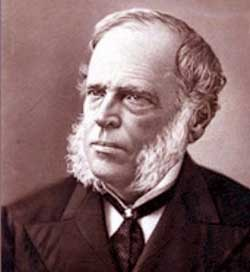
Antonio Bachiller Morales

Antonio Bachiller y Morales (1812–1889) was a Cuban lawyer, historian and bibliographer, the "father of Cuban bibliography".

According to the archaeologist L. Antonio Curet, Bachiller y Morales was the first Caribbean person in historiography to adopt the term "Taini" (Taino) to describe the Indigenous peoples of the Greater Antilles, when the term was used in his 1883 book Cuba Primitiva.

== Life ==
Antonio Bachiller y Morales was born to a wealthy family in Havana.

== Works ==
- Apuntes para la historia de las letras y instrucción publica de la isla de Cuba [Notes for a History of Letters and Public Education in Cuba], 3 vols, 1859–1860
- Cuba primitiva, 1880
- Cuba: Monografía histórica ... desde la perdida de la Habana hasta la restauración española, 1883
