= Conrado Walter Massaguer =

Cuban artist and magazine publisher (1889–1965)

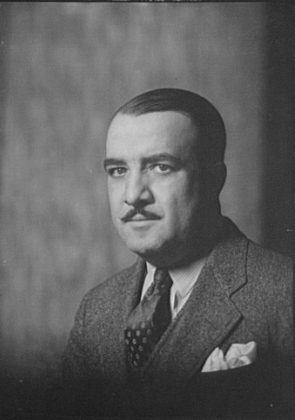

Public Relations Director of the Cuban Institute of Tourism
- In office 1952–1960
- President: Fulgencio Batista; Fidel Castro

Creator and Publisher of Carteles Magazine
- In office 1919–1953
- Succeeded by: Miguel Ángel Quevedo

Personal details
- Born: 3 March 1889 Cárdenas, Cuba
- Died: 18 October 1965 (aged 76) Havana, Cuba
- Awards: Knight of the National Order Carlos Manuel de Céspedes; Commander of the National Order of the Red Cross; Knight of the Finlay Order
- Nickname: El César de la Caricatura

Conrado Walter Massaguer y Diaz (3 March 1889 – 18 October 1965) was a Cuban caricaturist, political satirist, and magazine publisher. He is considered a student of the Art Nouveau. He was the first caricaturist in the world to broadcast his art on television. He was first caricaturist to exhibit on Fifth Avenue. He was the first caricaturist in the world to exhibit his caricatures on wood. He, and his brother Oscar, were the first magazine publishers in the world to use photolithographic printing.

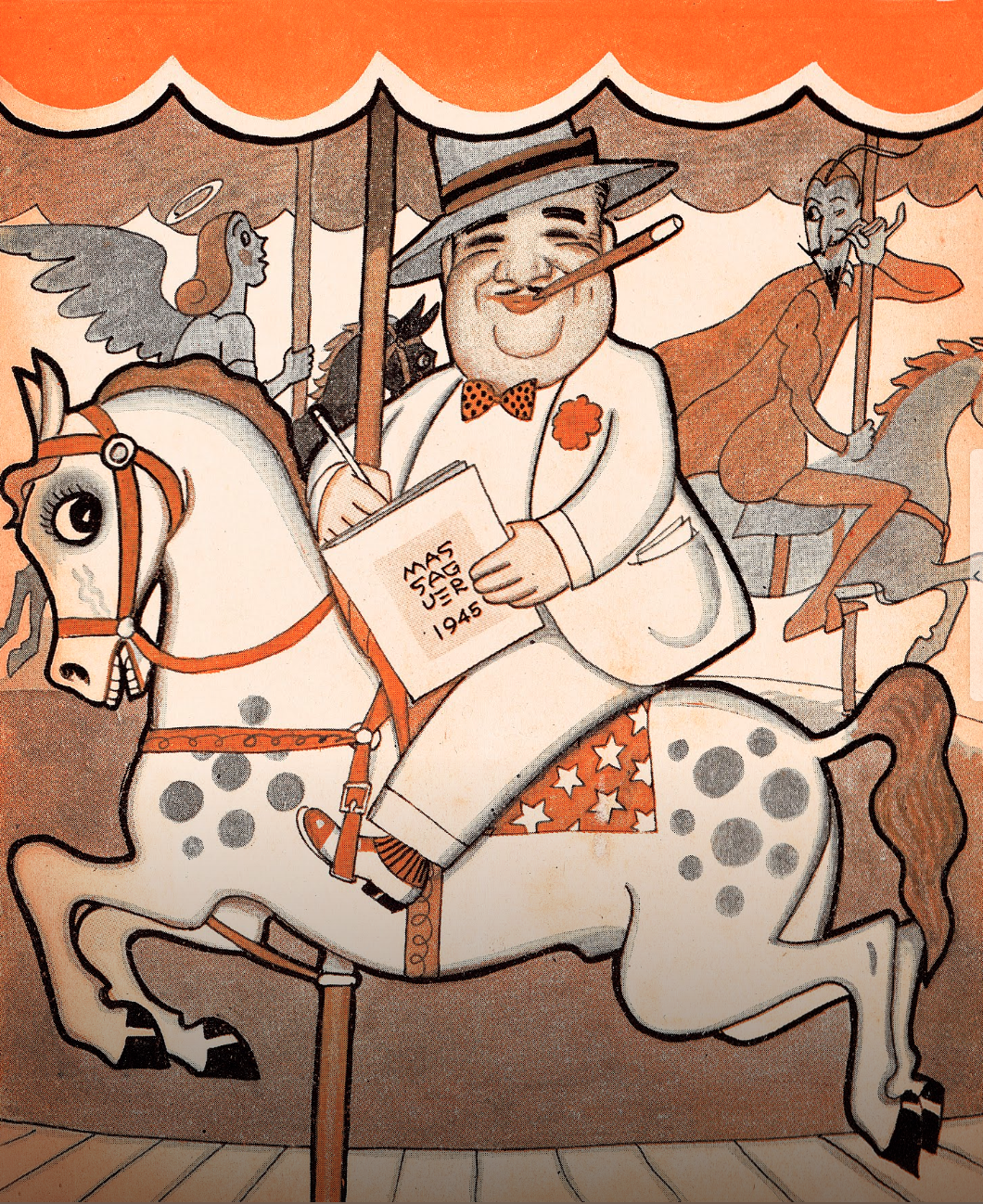
Self portrait of Conrado Walter Massaguer, depicted on a carrousel ride, with the devil over his left shoulder and an angel over his right. (1945)

He created the magazine Social with his brother Oscar to showcase Cuban artistic talent. The duo later created the magazine Carteles, which became for a period the most popular magazine in Cuba, which was purchased by Miguel Ángel Quevedo in 1953.

In his life, he met and drew caricatures of Franklin D. Roosevelt, Walt Disney, Albert Einstein, the King of Spain, and many others. In sum total, he was the author of more than 28 thousand caricatures and drawings. Ernest Hemingway once had to refrain himself from punching Massaguer in the face after the artist drew an unflattering caricature of him. The dictator Gerardo Machado, however, did not punch Massaguer for his own unflattering caricature - he had the artist deported.

He was one of the most internationally renowned Cuban artists of his day, and his art is still regularly featured in galleries across the Western Hemisphere and Europe.

== Early life ==
Massaguer was born on October 18, 1889, in Cárdenas, Cuba. In 1892, his family moved to Havana.

When the Cuban War of Independence broke out, Massaguer's family escaped the country. From 1896 to 1908, he lived in Mérida, Mexico. However, during this time, his parents enrolled him in the New York Military Academy, where he stayed during school years.

In 1905, after graduating the military academy, he briefly attended the San Fernando school in Havana, where he was tutored by Ricardo de la Torriente and Leopoldo Romañach.

In 1906, less than a year later, he returned to the family home in Mexico.

== Career as artist ==
=== Early career ===
While living in Yucatán, Mexico, Massaguer published his first caricatures in local newspapers and magazines. These included La Campana, La Arcadia, and the Diario Yucateco.

In 1908, he moved back to Havana. After returning to the island in 1908, Massaguer began mingling with Havana's aristocratic circles, forming close friendships with some of the city's most powerful and influential men, as well as winning the favor of many women who were quickly charmed by him. Massaguer, largely self-taught, honed his style using the avant-garde techniques he studied from the European and American magazines that were widely available in Cuba at the time.

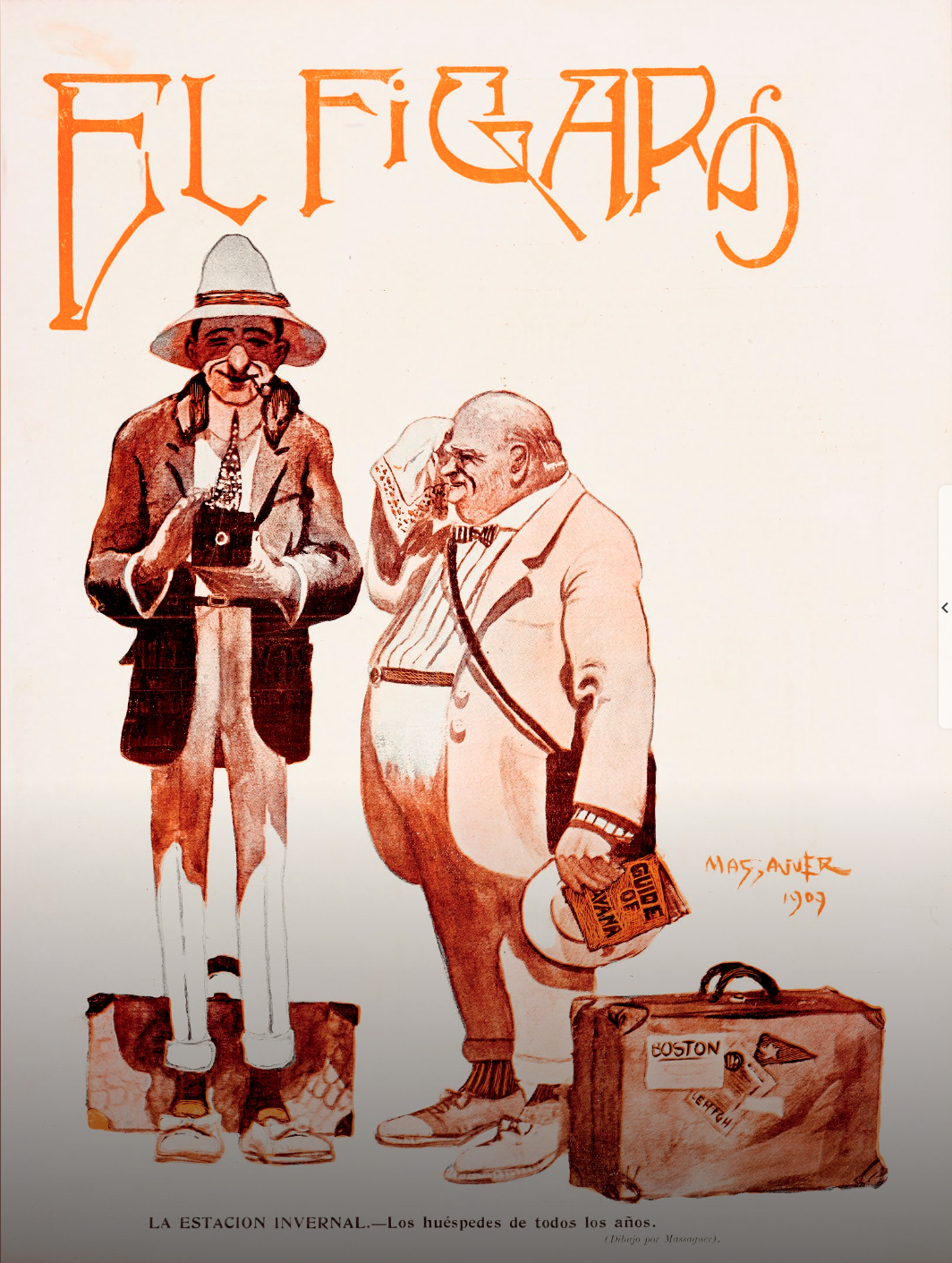
Cover of the immensely popular Cuban magazine El Figaro, drawn by Massaguer in 1909. This cover depicts two bumbling, incompetent American tourists to the island.

He started drawing for El Fígaro, and was featured prominently on the cover in 1909.

After two years of refining his craft, Havana announced a poster contest aimed at attracting North American tourists to stay in the city during the winter months. Notable figures like Leopoldo Romañach, Armando Menocal, Rodríguez Morey, Jaime Valls, and others also entered the competition. The jury was particularly impressed by the modern execution and creative solution of one piece, signed by Massaguer, who was relatively unknown at the time.

The jury deliberations caused a great controversy. The prize was ultimately awarded to the Galician painter Mariano Miguel, who had recently married the daughter of Nicolás Rivero, the wealthy owner of the conservative newspaper Diario de la Marina. Although Massaguer received only an honorable mention, the fraud scandal caused such an uproar that his name quickly entered the public spotlight, and he became an overnight sensation.

In 1910, he became co-owner of the advertising agency Mercurio, with Laureano Rodríguez Castells. At Mercurio, he led the Susini cigar campaign, and earned substantial wealth.

Massaguer has been described as a restless man, in both mind and body. After earning enough money from his art to begin traveling, he was almost always doing so. He constantly traveled between New York City and Havana, Mexico and France, Europe and the Americas.

In 1911, his reputation among the Havana socialites solidified when he organized his own first public caricature exhibit, and also the first Caricature Salon ever held in the Americas, hosted at Athenaeum of Havana (the Ateneo), and the Círculo de La Habana. Other exhibitors here included Maribona, Riverón, Portell Vilá, Valer, Botet, Barsó, García Cabrera, Carlos Fernández, Rafael Blanco, and Hamilton de Grau.

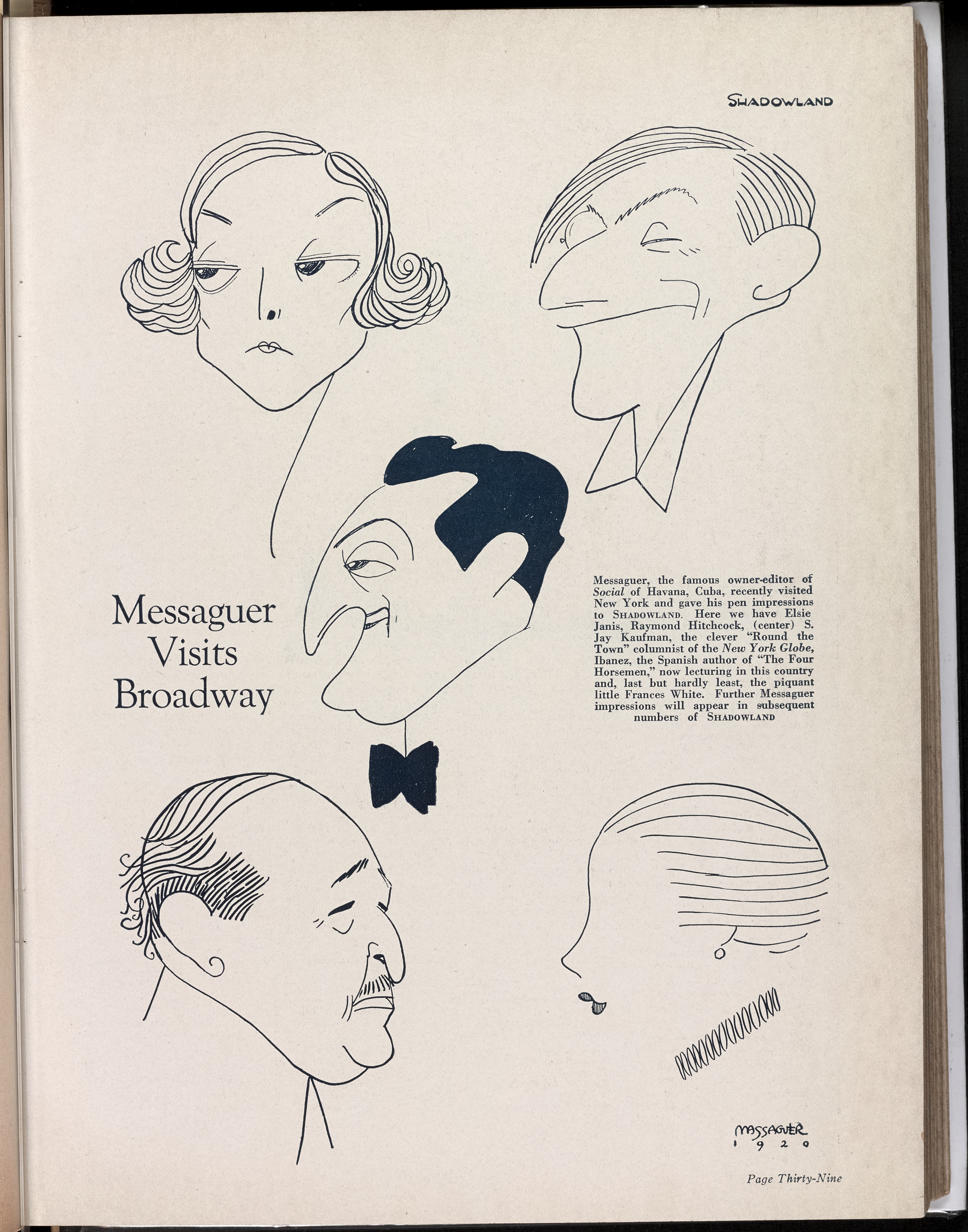
"Messaguer Visits Broadway." Caricatures of theatrical and literary figures. Elsie Janis, Raymond Hitchcock, S. Jay Kaufman (columnist), Ibanez, author of The Four Horsemen, and Frances White

In 1912, in the New York American Journal, he published his first Broadway drawings.

From 1913 to 1918, he was an editor for Gráfico.

=== Social ===
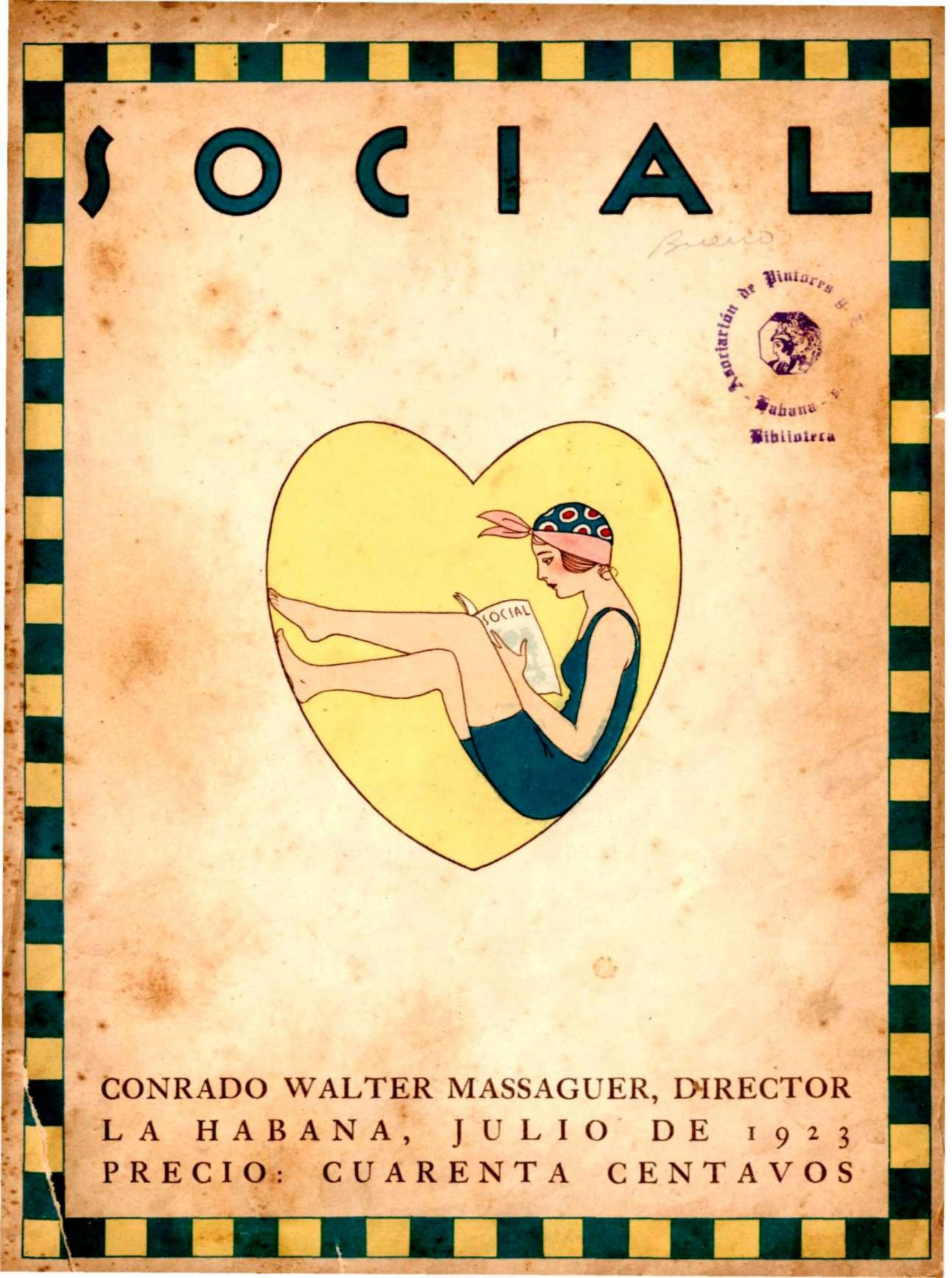
Cover of the magazine Social, July 7, 1923

In 1916, he created the magazine Social with his brother, Oscar H. Massaguer. Social's contributors included Guillén Carpentier, Chacón y Calvo, Enrique José Varona and others. Social has been described as Massaguer's great love in the magazine industry, and was the property that historians say he cared the most about. Social was an innovative magazine, being the first magazine in the world to use a modern printing process called photolithographic printing.

Social set cultural trends, not only in the fashion of Cuba, but in art, politics, and Cuban identity. Social catered to a certain aesthetic in Cuba - that of the sophisticated elite socialite - but Massaguer would also use this magazine to ridicule and jibe against that same class of society when he found their personalities worthy of his contempt.

In Social, readers could find a variety of content, including short stories, avant-garde poetry, art reviews, philosophical essays, and serialized novels, as well as articles on interior design, haute couture, and fashion. Occasionally, the magazine also featured reports on sports such as motor racing, rowing, tennis, and horse riding. The cultural promotion efforts of both Massaguer and Emilio Roig de Leuchsenring are evident in the magazine. Notably, this period overlaps with their involvement in the Minorista Group, which was then at the forefront of the country's intellectual life. Many contributors were devoted members of the group, leading some experts to consider Social as the cultural voice of the Minoristas.

One of the features of Social magazine was its section called "Massa Girls," which was a play on his own name, and pronounced with a glottal 'g' in a similar fashion to the letter in Massaguer. Massaguer drew women as independent and free-thinking, and never drew the woman celebrity as a caricature of herself, but as a free agent surrounded by caricatures. However, Massaguer himself has been described as a womanizer in his personal life, and hesitant to fully embrace every facet of women's liberation.

In 1916, he also established la Unión de Artes Gráficas and the advertising agency Kesevén Anuncios.

The art critic Bernardo González Barroa wrote:

“Massaguer has solved the problem of working hard, living comfortably off what his art produces and not missing any artistic, sporting or social event. His broad, childish laugh, of a carefree individual who carries his luck hidden in a pocket, appears everywhere for the moment, disguising the pranks of pupils that lurk, mock and, finally, flash with satisfaction at finding the characteristic point after having analyzed a soul... Massaguer's personality is beginning to solidify now. He has been the best-known and most popular caricaturist for a long time, but his technique had not reached the security, the mastery of values that he presents in his latest works, which is very natural and explainable”

=== Carteles ===
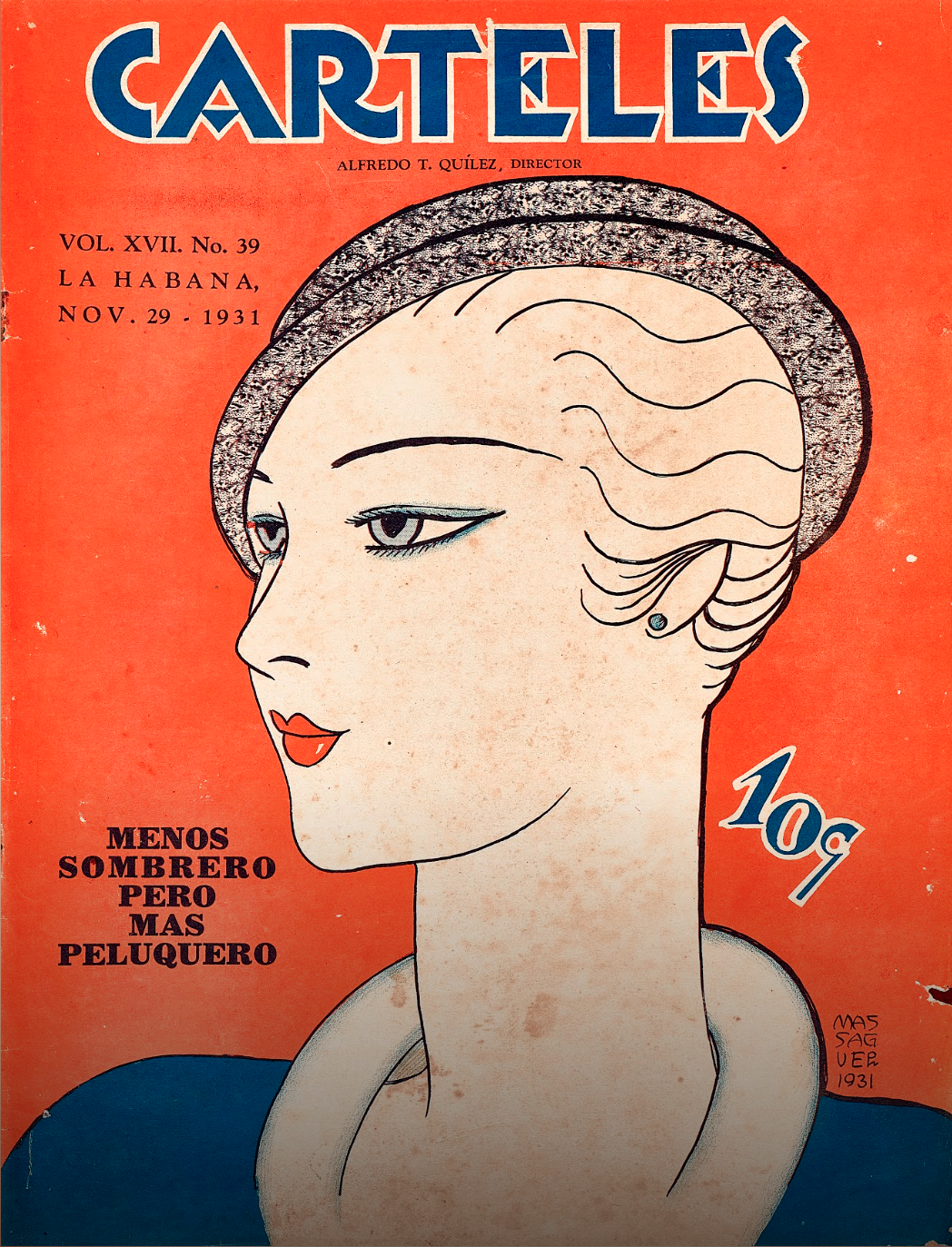
Cover of the magazine Carteles, November 29, 1931

In 1919, Massaguer and his brother created the magazine Carteles. Carteles gained the widest circulation of any magazine in Latin America, and the most popular magazine in Cuba for a time, until that title was claimed by Revista Bohemia. Carteles remained in print until July 1960. This magazine showcased Cuban commerce, art, sports, and social life before the revolution.

In 1924, Carteles took a more political turn, with articles criticizing Gerardo Machado's government. It became a prime example of the humor and graphic design employed by artists like Horacio Rodríguez Suria and Andrés García Benítez to reflect on Cuban society and politics. Esteemed writers such as Alejo Carpentier and Emilio Roig de Leuchsenring also contributed to its pages. In 1953, Carteles was purchased by Miguel Ángel Quevedo, the director of Bohemia.

In 1921, Massaguer created the Primera Exposición de Humor (the First Humor Exhibition).

=== Cinelandia ===
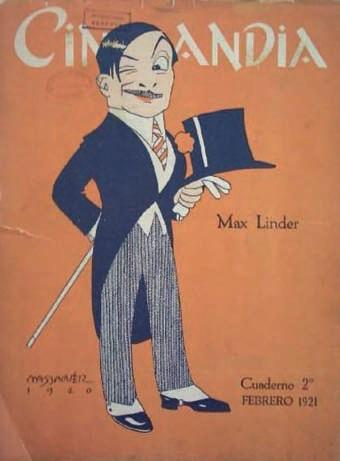
Max Linder drawn by Conrado Walter Massaguer on the February 1921 cover of Cinelandia.

In January, 1921, Massaguer and his brother collaborated to create yet another magazine, Cinelandia, a magazine focused on Hollywood and cinema lifestyle. Massaguer acted as Artistic Director of this magazine, where he set the artistic tone, selected the photographs, managed the layout, tone, and visual balance of the magazine. Cinelandia was more visually motivated, and was not focused on the written word. This magazine heavily featured Hollywood actors and celebrities of the day, far more than it did those celebrities of Mexico or Argentina - even though in this era, the three different film industries were relatively comparable in size.

In April, 1921, Cinelandia quoted the Argentinian Columbia University professor, Enrique Gil:

"[Latin American] merchants have the movies as guides. They have discovered that the demand for merchandise manufactured in the United States is very great after an American movie has been shown in the locality and therefore they are very interested in knowing the dates of the exhibitions of the movies made by the main manufacturers [sic] of the United States... I am very optimistic about the future of commercial relations between the two Americas, because due to your disinterested [North American] and idealistic [sic] attitude during the war, you have in your favor a psychological predisposition and interest on the part of the inhabitants of South America."

In 1923, Massaguer published the book Guignol, which was a collection of his art. In the introduction to Guignol, Massaguer wrote:

“Sometimes a tight shoe, a flowery buttonhole, a peculiar movement when walking, reveals the soul of the model... The tendency of those of us who follow the modern school of caricature is to simplify by exaggeration”

=== Marriage and New York studio ===
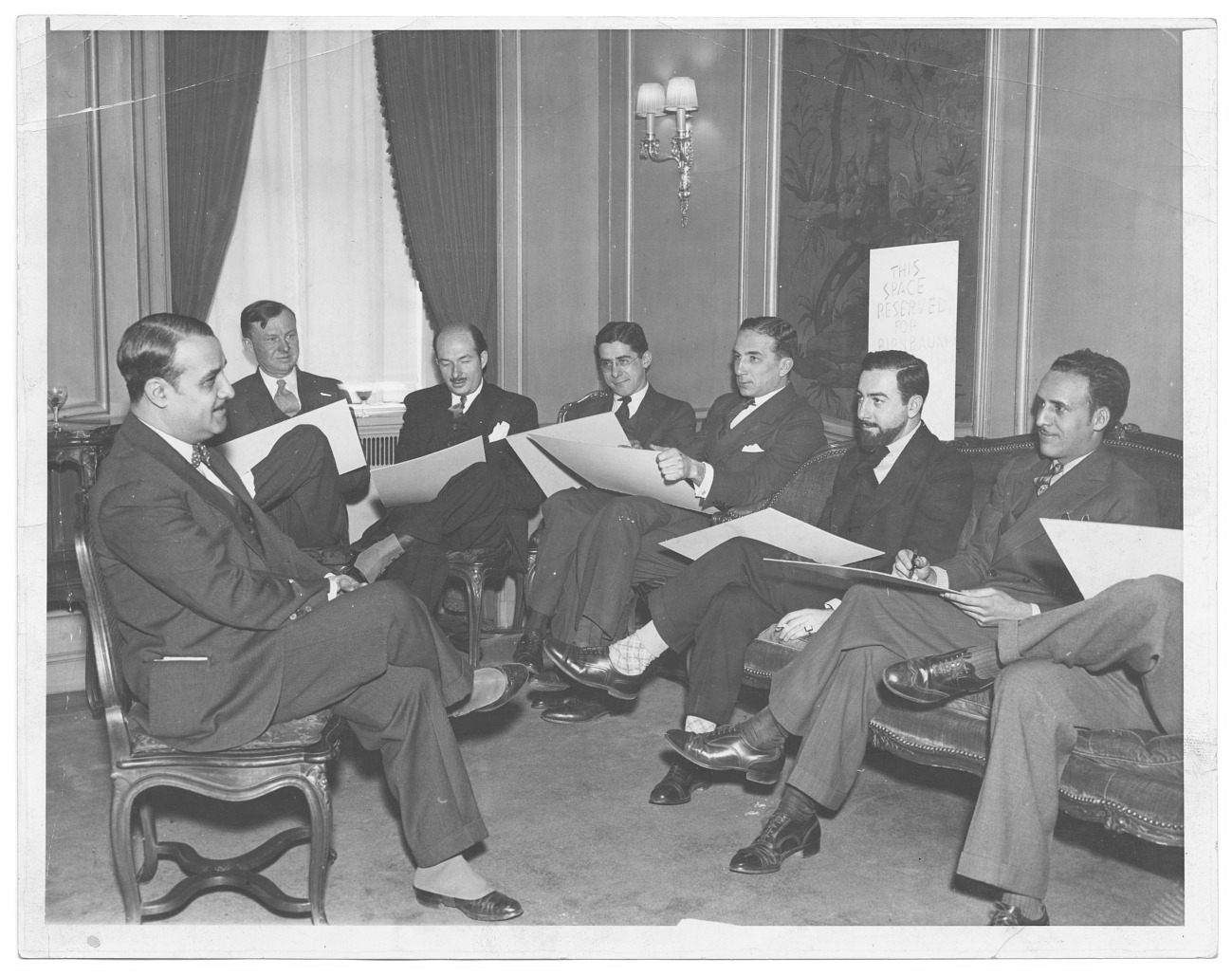
Group of caricaturists drawing portraits of Conrado Massaguer. Pictured here from left to right: Conrado Massaguer, Alfred Frueh; Xavier Cugat; Alex Gard; Sam Berman; Al Hirschfeld; and Abril Lamarque.

In 1924, he moved to New York with his wife, the niece of Mario García Menocal. The two spent their honeymoon at the Waldorf Astoria New York. Massaguer then established a studio in the city.

While living in New York, he worked on the magazines;

- Life
- The New Yorker
- Collier’s
- Vanity Fair
- American Magazine
- Redbook
- Cosmopolitan
- Literary Digest
- Sunday World
- Town and Country

=== Return to Havana ===
In 1925, Massaguer returned to Havana, and he settled down for a while, and he did not leave Cuba for several years.

Massaguer's daughter, Conchita, was born in 1927.

In 1927, he published Sobremesa sabática, which featured Emilio Roig de Leuchsenring, Fernando Ortiz, José Manuel Acosta, Juan José Sicre, Jaime Valls Díaz, Rubén Martínez Villena, Juan Marinello, Jorge Mañach, Alejo Carpentier, José Antonio Fernández de Castro, Antonio Gattorno Águila, José Zacarías Tallet.

In 1929, Massaguer exhibited at the Paris art gallery “Jean Charpentier.” He also toured Europe.

Also in 1929, at the League of Nations in Geneva, he acted as the art editor for the King Features Syndicate.

=== Exile ===
In the late 1920s, Massaguer made the mistake of creating an unflattering caricature of the Cuban dictator Gerardo Machado - and was deported from the country. From 1931 to 1933, he was exiled in the United States, and spent time writing for publications regarding the American government's response to the Great Depression. While he was living in exile, Machado was overthrown in the Cuban Revolution of 1933. Massaguer resumed semi-regular travels back to Cuba, but primarily maintained his life in New York until 1937.

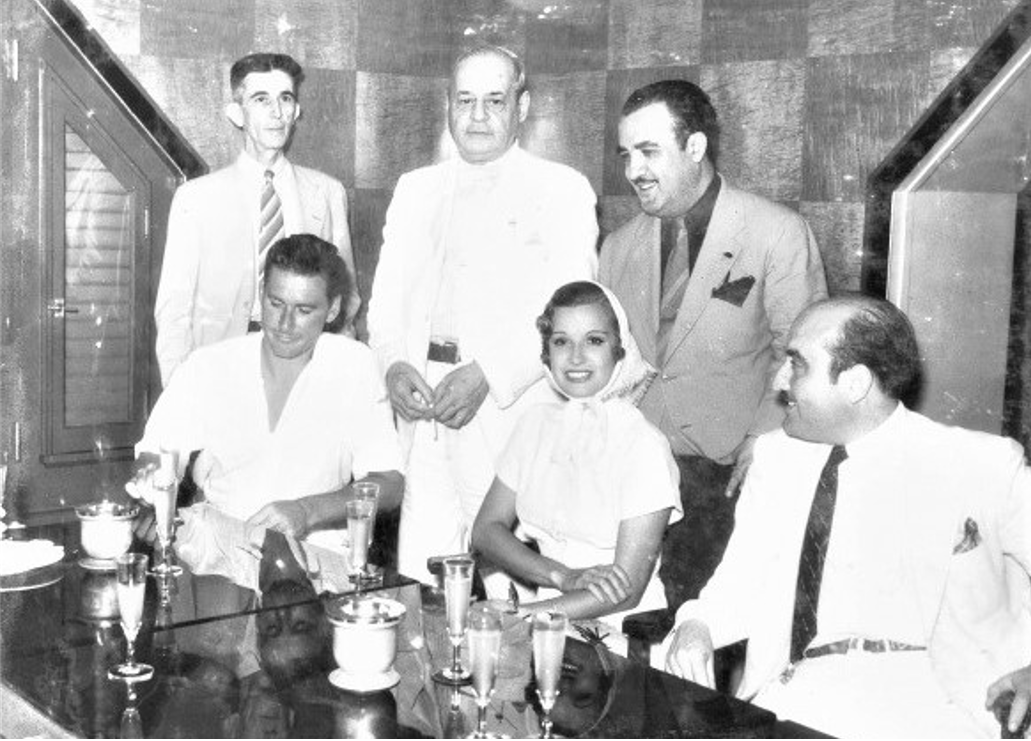
Conrado Massaguer and Agustín Acosta (left) with Errol Flynn, his wife Lili Damita, and others in Rafael "Pappy" Valiente's Bacardi Club, which was an elite club hidden inside of the Bacardi Building in Havana. Pappy is pictured in the center of the frame.

He particularly enjoyed being free again to travel to Cuba in order to legally purchase and partake in the alcoholic beverages of Havana's clubs - whereas Prohibition in the United States ended in the same year as the fall of Machado. While on his excursions to the nightclubs of Cuba, especially to the Bacardi Club - hidden inside of the Bacardi Building - he continued to mingle with Havana socialites and other notables.

While in exile, in 1933, he illustrated the book People Worth Talking About, by Cosmo Hamilton.

He was visited regularly and interacted with the New York social elite, and many Cuban exiles, including Pablo de la Torriente Brau and Teresa Casuso Morín. Not only did he draw Walt Disney, it has been written that both Disney and James Montgomery Flagg greatly admired Massaguer, and the three cartoonists attended social occasions together.

== Later life ==
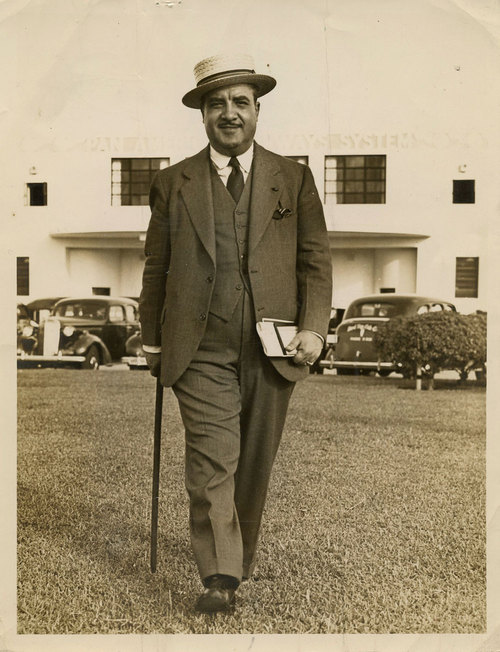
Conrado Massaguer in Havana, 1939.

While he did return to Cuba in 1937, he still maintained his travels to New York, and painted a large graphic mural at the Cuba Pavilion of the 1939 New York World's Fair. However, this mural - a depiction of the island of Cuba as a rumba dancer, and Franklin D. Roosevelt playing the drum beat that Cuba was dancing to. This mural caused President Federico Laredo Brú to have the exhibit immediately destroyed. The Cuban President said that the exhibit had damaged Cuba's reputation in America by slandering F.D.R.

From 1945 to 1949, he worked as a caricaturist for the newspaper Información.

In 1952, he became the public relations director of the Cuban Institute of Tourism.

In 1959, with the conclusion of the Cuban Revolution, the government of Fulgencio Batista was overthrown by Fidel Castro and the 26th of July Movement. The Castro regime offered him "opportunities" to draw the heroes of the Revolution. One of Massaguer's most famous works from this period is one of Camilo Cienfuegos, Che Guevara, and Fidel Castro and a dove perched on one of their shoulders.

In 1962, complaining that his hands were tired and shaking, Massaguer retired from art. He donated 20 albums of his work to the National Archives of Cuba.

In 1965, Massaguer published his autobiography.

Massaguer died on October 18, 1965, in Havana.

== Second life of artworks ==
=== Cuba ===
In 1989, on the Centenary of his birth, the Cuban Museo Nacional de Bellas Artes featured an exhibition on Massaguer, and brought the artist to life once again in the communist country.

In 1998, the University of Havana created the "Conrado Massaguer Chair of Graphic Arts," and holds regular exhibitions of his works.

His works have also been featured at the Palacio de los Capitanes Generales, the City Museum of Havana, and the Cárdenas Art Gallery.

=== United States ===
The Franklin D. Roosevelt Presidential Library and Museum maintains stewardship of certain historical works of Massaguer that caricatured the President in an unflattering manner during the Great Depression.

For some time, the historian Vicki Gold Levi maintained the largest private collection of Massaguer's works in the United States, until 2019, when she donated dozens of Massaguer's artworks to the Wolfsonian art museum at Florida International University.

That summer, the Wolfsonian featured several Massaguer's work in several collections;

- Cover Girls
- Caricaturas

Several of his original works have since been successfully auctioned on the art market.

In 2022, Massaguer's work was showcased by the Cuban Cultural Center of New York.
