= Agustín Acosta =

Agustín Acosta may refer to:

- Agustín Acosta (baseball), Cuban baseball player
- Agustín Acosta (footballer) (born 2001), Uruguayan footballer
- Agustín Acosta (poet) (1886–1979), Cuban poet and politician
