= List of Cuban comic creators =

This is a list of Cuban comic creators. Although comics have different formats, this list mainly focuses on comic book and graphic novel creators. However, some creators of comic strips are also found here, as are some of the early innovators of the artform.

This list contains all authors with Cuba as country of origin, although they may have published, or now be resident in other countries.

- Abela, Eduardo
- Arístides Hernández Guerrero also known as Ares
- Aguilar, Antonio
- Alba, Orlando
- Alfonso, Reinaldo
- Alfonso Cruz, Roberto also known as Robe
- Gutiérrez Vásquez, Alfredo
- Alonso, Dora
- Alonso, Fabio
- Alonso, Manolo
- Alonso, Miriam
- Alpizar, Pedro
- Alvárez, Moreno
- Alvárez, Pedro
- Alvárez Cabada, Sommy
- Andrés
- Antro
- Aparicio, Walfrido also known as Wal
- Aragón, D.
- Pumariega, Arístide
- Armada, Santiago also known as Chago
- Arroyito
- Artiles Acosta, Miguel
- Avellanet, Thelma
- Avilés Montalvo, Cecilio
- Bandomo, Luis
- Barredo, Eduardo
- Barrionuevo, Rafaél
- Barro, Carla
- Behmaras, Marcos
- Bencomo, Luis
- Benítez, Adigio
- Bertrán, Juan
- Betancourt, Juan
- Betanzos Hernández, Miguel
- Blanco Ávila, Francisco
- Blanco Hernández, Francisco
- Bulit, Ilse
- Caignet B., Félix
- Callejas A., Miguel
- Calvo, Alfredo
- Canovaca
- Cánovas, Alexis
- Cantelli, Adelfa
- Caparó, Javier also known as Kaparó
- Capdevila, Samuel
- Capotel, Gladys
- Carballido Rey, Juan
- Cárdenas, Mike
- Cardi, Juan
- Cardoso Onelio, Jorge
- Villar Alemán, Carlos
- Carranza Rouselot, Lucio
- Casaus, Victor
- Castellanos, Ramón
- Castillo Barzaga, Luis
- Avilés Montalvo, Cecilio also known as Cecilio
- Ceballos López, Ubaldo
- Chavarría, Daniel
- Chavianol, Daína
- Chirino, Lilian
- Claudio
- Cordero, Victor also known as Vic
- Coto
- Couto, Armando
- Cruz, Marta
- Cruz Montano, José also known as Pecruz
- Dagoberto
- Daiviel López, Karel
- Damián González, Ignacio
- De Armas, Jesús
- De Jesús Ramos, Ulises
- De La Torriente, Ricardo
- De La Nuez, Nelson
- De La Nuez, René
- Delgado Vélez, José F.
- Del Real, Aramis
- De Montemar, René
- Díaz, Hilario
- Díaz, Pedro
- Díaz Portillo, Miguel
- Díaz Rafael, Gregorio
- Díaz Rivero, Recaredo
- Domínguez, José R.
- Dopico
- Dueñas
- Duque Estrada
- Duque Sánchez, Luis Oscar
- Durán Llopís, Alexis
- Escobar Froilán
- Estapé, Angel
- Estapé, Newton
- E.T., Jorge
- Fabiana
- Falbello, Luis
- Feijoó, Samuel
- Fernández, Juan Carlos
- Fernández Franco, Emilio
- Ferrufino, Rafaél
- Fontanillas, Silvio
- Fornés Collado, Rafaél
- Frades, E.
- Frémez
- Fresquet, Freaquito
- Fresquet Chamaco, Luis
- Fuentes, Norberto
- Fuentes, Plácido
- Fundora, Lázaro
- Galindo, Adolfo
- Galindo, Ana
- García, Antonio
- García, David
- García, Nelson
- García Cabrera, Enrique
- García Cañizares, René
- García Leyva, Alberto
- García Pampín, Ricardo
- García Rodríguez, Domingo
- García Rodríguez, Felipe also known as Felgar
- García Terminel, Domingo
- Gasca
- Geli
- Gil, Roberto
- Gómez, Antonio
- González, Teresita
- González Díaz, Gaspar
- González Hijo, Carmelo
- González Reyes, Rolando
- González Viera, Pedro also known as Péglez
- Grant, Francisco
- Guerra, Félix
- Guerra Pensado, Jorge Luis
- Gutiérrez Saborit, Eusebio also known as Chevo
- Gutiérrez Vásquez, Alfredo also known as Alfredo
- Hechavarría, Omar also known as Omar
- Henríquez, Hernán also known as Hernán H.
- Hernández, Luis Manuel
- Hernández, Sergio
- Hernández Cárdenas
- Hernández Guerrero, Roberto
- Hernández Valdés, Manuel also known as Manuel
- Honoré
- Jaime, Demetrio
- Janer, César
- Javier
- Jiménez, Teresa
- Jordi, Virgilio
- Kuchilán Sol, Mario
- Lamar Cuervo, Manuel also known as Lillo
- Lamarque, Abril
- Landaluze, Patricio
- Lázaro
- Leyva Rosa
- Lillo, Rafaél
- Linares Díaz, Adalberto
- Llaguno, Oscar
- López, Juan José also known as Juan José
- López Palacios, José Luis also known as José Luis
- Lorenzo Sosa, Luis
- Luaces
- Lursen, Niko
- Má Argudín, Angel
- Hernández Valdés, Manuel also known as Manuel
- Mantilla, Alfredo
- Marcelino
- Mariño Souto, Antonio also known as Ñico
- Martín, Angel
- Martín, Pedro
- Martínez, Gianni also known as Gianni
- Martínez, José
- Martínez, René also known as René
- Martínez, Yuri
- Martínez Sopeña, René
- Martínez Gaínza, Virgilio also known as Virgilio
- Martirena Hernández, Alfredo
- Massaguer, Conrado W.
- Matamoros, Luis also known as Lumat
- Maza, Heriberto
- Menrique Ardión, Alberto
- Miguel
- Mirabal, Alberto
- Miranda, Anisia
- Mizrahí Marcos, José
- Morales, Juan Maurilio also known as Dodo
- Morales, Pedro
- Morales Ajubel, Alberto
- Morales Vega, Fidel
- Morante Boyerizo, Rafaél
- Motta, Francisco
- Muñoz, Honorio
- Muñoz Bachs, Eduardo also known as Bachs
- Nelson
- Niple Mamerto, L.
- Nogueras, Wichi
- Nordelo
- Novoa, Mario
- Nuñez, Javier
- Nuñez, Raúl
- Nuñez Machín, Ana also known as África
- Nuñez Rodríguez, Enrique
- Oliver Medina, Jorge also known as Oli
- Orta, Jesús also known as Indio Naborí
- Ortega, Elio
- Ortega, Gregorio
- Ortega Vásquez, Elio
- Ortiz, Marcelino
- Osvaldo
- Pablo José
- Padrón Blanco, Ernesto
- Padrón Blanco, Juan
- Pazos, Antonio
- Peña, Antonio
- Peña Mora, Rodolfo
- Peñalver, Moreno
- Pérez, Galdós
- Pérez, Olga Marta
- Pérez Alfaro, Manuel
- Pérez Lujardo, Pavel also known as Pavel
- Perna, Mirtha
- Piñera, Virgilio
- Ponce, Mario
- Portell Vilá, Heriberto
- Posada, José Luis
- Prado Álvarez, Gustavo also known as Pitín
- Prohías, Antonio
- Pumariega, Arístide also known as Arístide
- Raggi, Tulio
- Ramos Puig, Gabriel also known as Gaby
- Reyes, Chaly
- Reyes Ramos, Ricardo also known as Richard
- Reyes, Sarah
- Rido
- Rivera, Guillermo
- Rivero, Carlos
- Riverón
- Robreño, Carlos
- Robreño, Eduardo
- Robreño, Gustavo
- Roca, Blas also known as Tío Francisco
- Rodríguez, Félix
- Rodríguez, Gustavo also known as Garrincha
- Rodríguez Suría, Horacio also known as Horacio
- Rodríguez Quiñones, Horacio also known as Horacio R.Q.
- Rodríguez Ruiz, Francisco also known as Panchito
- Rodríguez, Silvio also known as Silvio
- Rodríguez Zayas, Tomás also known as Tomy
- Rodríguez Torres, Nilda
- Rodríguez Espinosa, Alberto Enrique also known as Alben
- Roger
- Rodulfo M.
- Rojas, Mirtha
- Rosales, Guillermo
- Roseñada, Leopoldo
- Rosita
- Ruiz, Juan
- Ruiz, Luis
- Saguez, Jordi
- Salas, Isauro Antonio
- Sánchez López, Vicente also known as Vicente
- Sánchez, Magaly
- Sansón Castro, Orlando
- Santiago, Felipe
- Santos, Mercedes
- Sanz, Lucía
- Saúl
- Serapión
- Suárez, Martha
- Suárez, Lemus Orestes
- Suárez Méndez, Pedro José also known as Pedro
- Simanca, Osmani
- Tamayo Maillo, Évora also known as Évora
- Tejedor, Cabrera Octavio
- Toledo, E.
- Torres Albuerne, Wilfredo
- Torres Martínez, Tomás also known as Tomaso
- Tosta, Mario
- Urra, Agustín
- Valdés Díaz, Angel
- Valdés, Fran
- Valdés, Jaime
- Valdés, Sonia
- Valdez Díaz, Humberto also known as Val
- Vázquez Portal, Manuel
- Vega, Luis
- Velasco, Angel
- Vergara, Tomás
- Vian, Ivette
- Vidal, Abelardo
- Vidal, Carlos P.
- Villamil
- Villar Alemán, Antonio also known as Tony
- Villar Alemán, Carlos also known as Carlucho
- Vitón, José Luis
- Vladimir
- Wilson Valera, Luis
- Ximénez, Tony
- Yañez, Alberto
- Zaldarriaga, Rafaél
