= Alfred Frueh =

American caricaturist (1880–1968)

Al Frueh
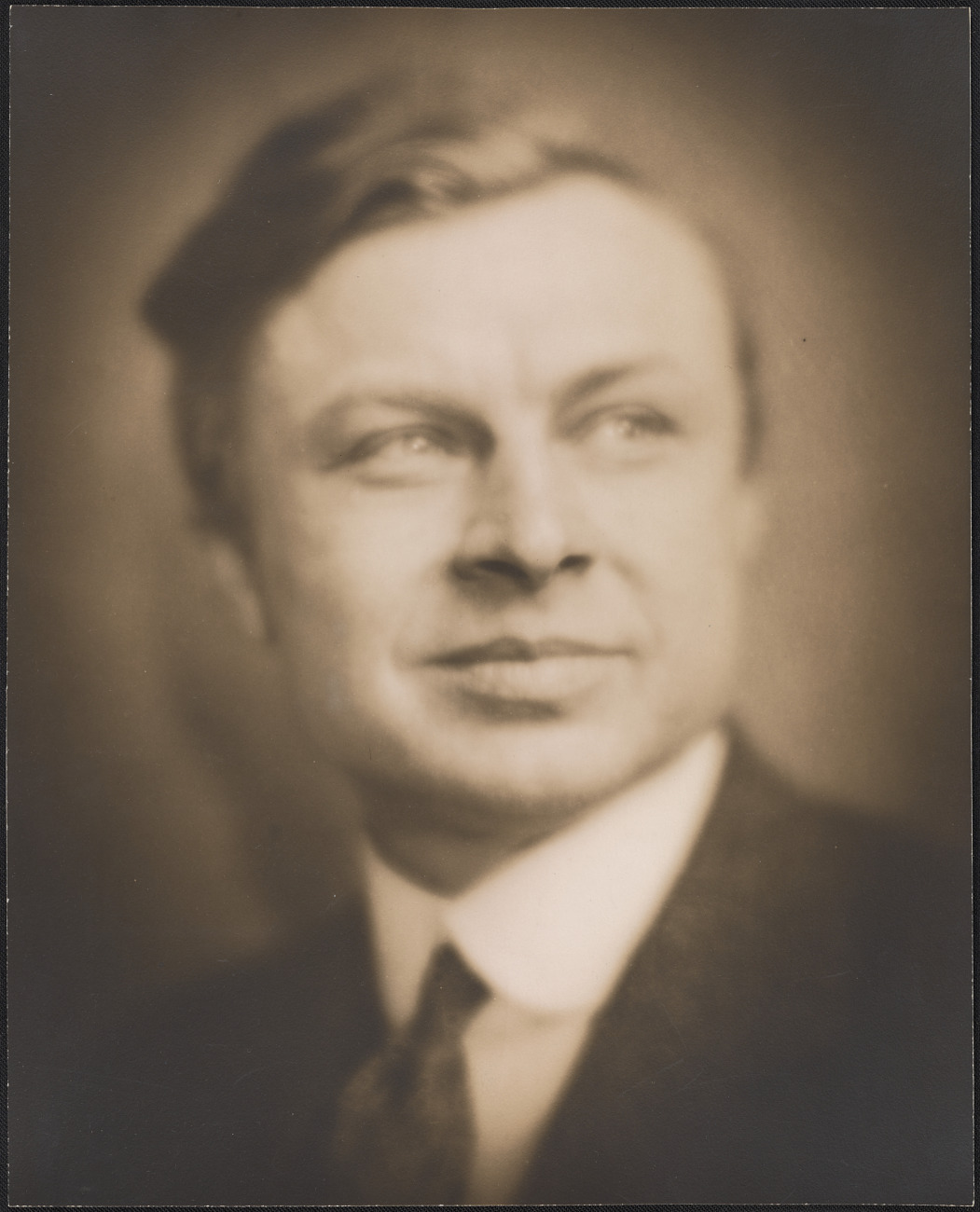
- Frueh in 1920
- Pronunciation: "free"
- Born: 1880; Lima, Ohio, United States
- Died: September 14, 1968 (aged 88); Sharon, Connecticut, United States
- Spouse: Giuliette Fanciulli
- Children: Barbara

Alfred Joseph Frueh (pronounced: "free"; 1880 – 14 September 1968) was an American caricaturist, political cartoonist, and humorist. In his Lakeville Journal obituary, he was lauded as "The most important theatrical caricaturist of his era." He was also an amateur horticulturist, who owned a fruit and nut farm. From 1904 to 1908, he worked for the St. Louis Dispatch. In 1908 and 1909, Frueh traveled through Europe, including the cities of Paris, London, Rome, Munich, Berlin, and Madrid. While living and loafing for bread money in Europe, he studied under Henri Matisse, Georges Braque, Theophile Steinlen, Lucien Simon, and Naudin.

In 1910, Frueh began working at the New York World, and worked there until 1925. However, his tenure at the World was briefly interrupted by another voyage to Europe from 1910 to 1914. While abroad, he married Giuliette Fanciulli.

Cover of the second issue of The New Yorker, drawn by Al Frueh

In 1925, he helped launch The New Yorker, and drew two cartoons in their first issue. He drew the cover art for The New Yorker's second issue, and worked as an artist for this magazine until he was 82 years old, retiring in 1962. In this capacity, he was one of the most important artists in New York City in the middle of the twentieth century, and drew celebrities, politicians, and other notable figures for the magazine that he met and interacted with in the city. His art is still on display in several museums around the country.

He died in Sharon, Connecticut on September 14, 1968.

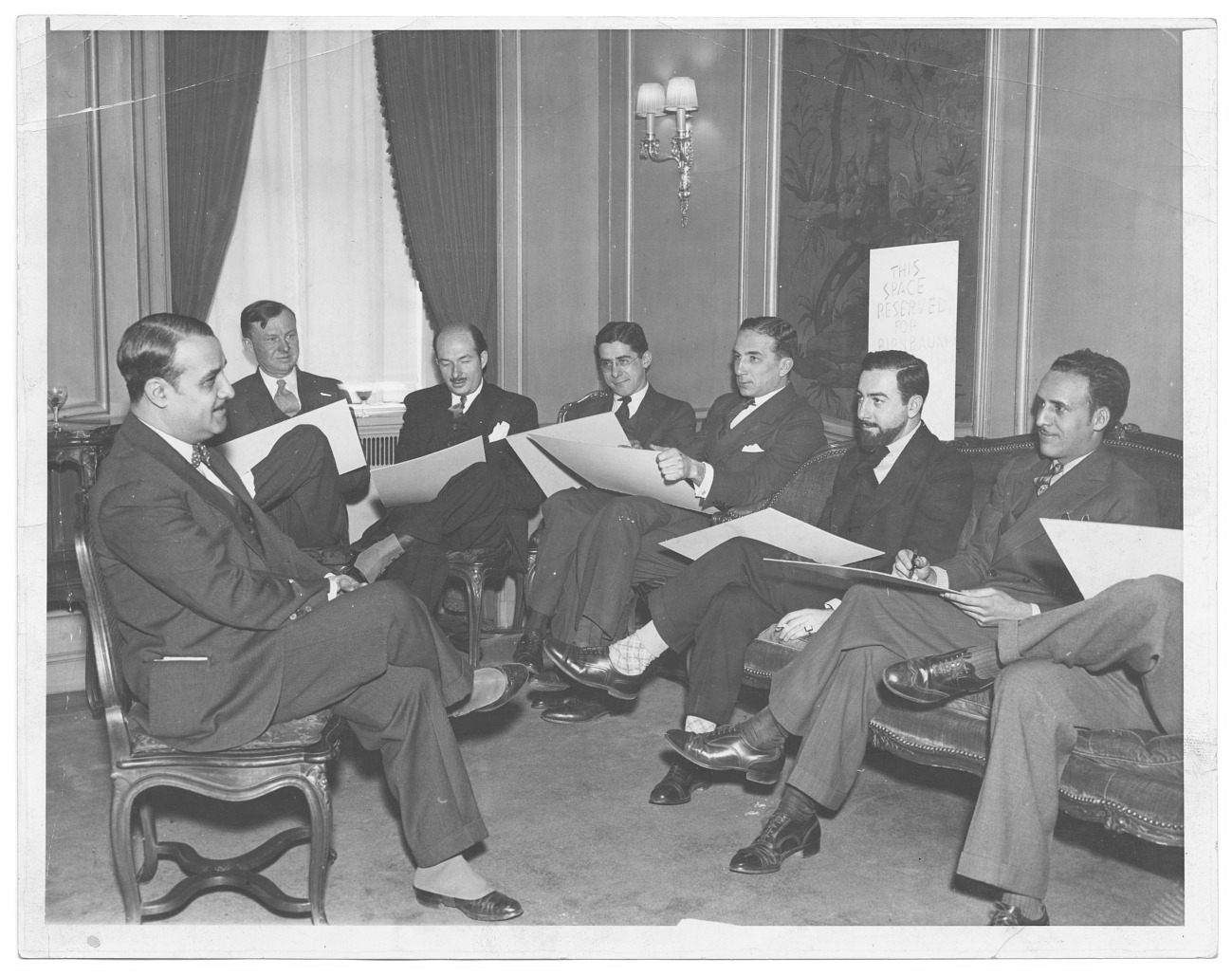
Group of caricaturists drawing portraits of Conrado Massaguer. From left to right: Conrado Walter Massaguer, Alfred Frueh; Xavier Cugat; Alex Gard; Sam Berman; Al Hirschfeld; and Abril Lamarque.
