= Carteles =

Defunct Cuban magazine

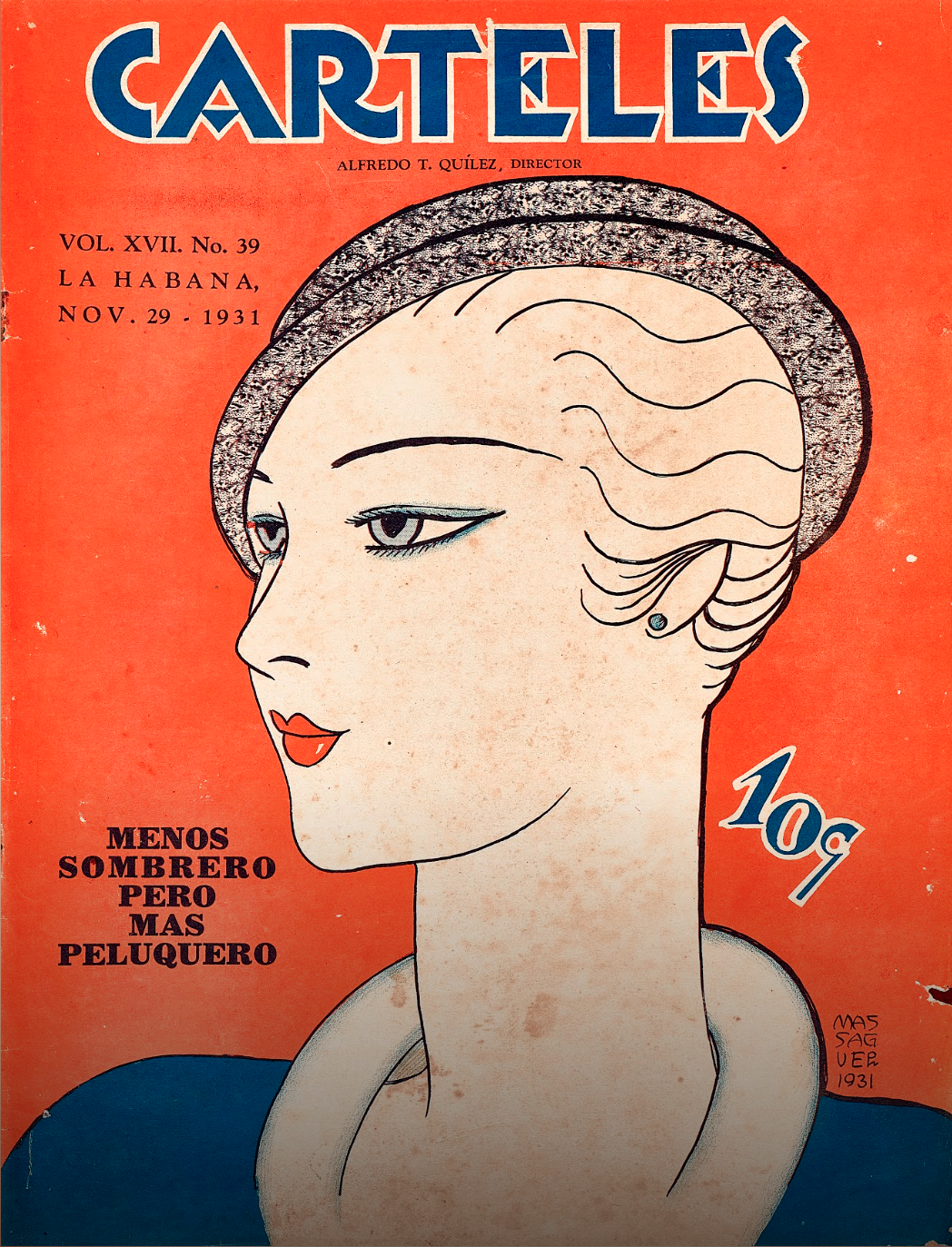
Cover of Carteles, November 29, 1931, drawn by Conrado Massaguer

Carteles was a Cuban magazine created by the famous brothers Oscar H. Massaguer and Conrado Walter Massaguer, who had already created the successful magazine Social. Carteles overtook Social, however, and gained the widest circulation of any magazine in Latin America. It became the most popular magazine in Cuba for a time, until that title was claimed by Bohemia. This magazine showcased Cuban commerce, art, sports, and social life. In the early half of the twentieth century, when Cuba was still a republic prior to the communist revolution, Carteles was immensely popular with the Cuban middle class. For most of its existence, it was helmed by the director Alfredo T. Quiléz.

== History ==
Established in 1919, this magazine was issued monthly without interruption until 1924, when Carteles became a weekly magazine.

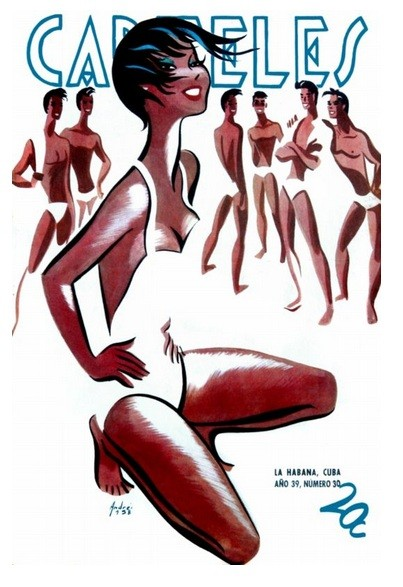
Cover of Carteles in its 39th year, drawn by Andrés García Benítez.

At this time, it also took a more political turn, with articles criticizing Gerardo Machado's government. It became a prime example of the humor and graphic design employed by artists like Horacio Rodríguez Suria and Andrés García Benítez to reflect on Cuban society and politics.

Regarding Andres Garcia Benitez, when he was first hired by Alfredo T. Quilez in 1932 to draw covers for the magazine, he was only 16 years old and had absolutely no academic training and had never had a single exhibit of his art. Yet his art has come to define an entire movement of pro-African art in Cuban culture.

In 1953, Carteles was purchased by Miguel Ángel Quevedo, the director of Bohemia.

In 1957, Carteles printed the first purely Cuban science fiction ever published in Cuba, written by José Hernández Artigas. Carteles also printed translated works of Ray Bradbury and other famous writers of the genre.

Carteles remained in print until July 1960, after the Cuban Revolution saw the mass media market in Cuba shuttered and transformed.

Edel Rodriguez acknowledges that Carteles was one of his primary sources of inspiration growing up.

== Notable contributors ==
- Conrado Walter Massaguer
- Oscar H. Massaguer
- Alejo Carpentier
- Emilio Roig de Leuchsenring
- Guillermo Cabrera Infante
- Virgilio Piñera
- José Manuel Acosta Bello
- Agustín Acosta Bello
- Andrés García Benítez
- Horacio Rodríguez Suria
- Ofelia Rodríguez Acosta
- Mariblanca Sabas Alomá
- Fernando Ortiz Fernández
- Ruben Rodriguez Villena
- Julio Antonio Mella
