= Agustín Acosta (poet) =

Cuban poet and politician (1886–1979)

Agustin Acosta y Bello
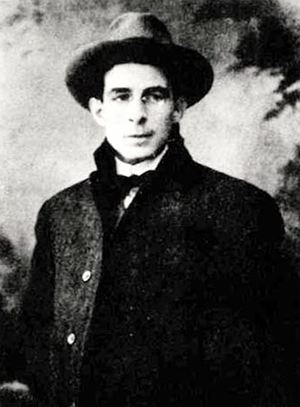

Provisional Governor of Matanzas
- In office 1933–1934

Senator of the Republic of Cuba
- In office 1936–1944

National Poet of Cuba
- In office 1955–1961
- Preceded by: Bonifacio Byrne
- Succeeded by: Nicolás Guillén

Personal details
- Born: November 12, 1886 Matanzas, Cuba
- Died: March 12, 1979 (aged 92) Miami
- Spouses: María Isabel Schweyer; Consuelo Díaz
- Children: Sara Bernaza
- Education: University of Havana

Agustín Acosta y Bello (1886–1979) was a Cuban poet, essayist, writer and politician. Acosta is considered by historians to be one of the most important Cuban writers of the twentieth century, and one of the three most important poets in the entire history of Cuba. Acosta was a revolutionary activist, and his poetry reflected his Cuban nationalism. He was both the National poet of Cuba and also one of its Senators, when the Republic still existed. He won awards for his poetry, but also spent time as a political prisoner for criticizing the Cuban President. He lambasted the hegemonic powers of the United States in the Caribbean, but also went into exile there in the last years of his life.

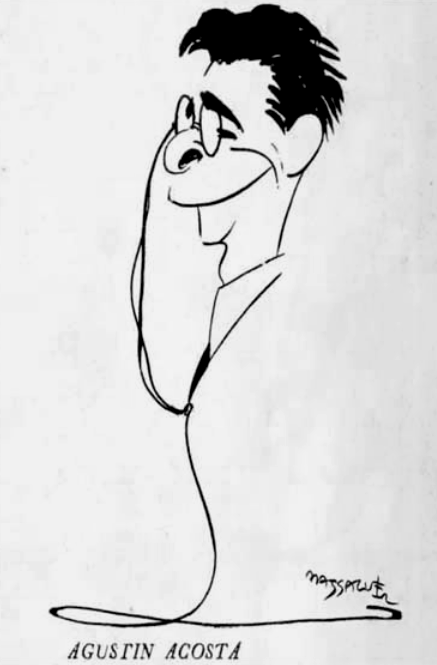
Sketch of Acosta drawn by Conrado Massaguer, the famous cartoonist and owner of the magazine Social.

Acosta's brother was José Manuel Acosta y Bello, one of the most famous Cuban political cartoonists of his day, who illustrated most of Acosta's poems when they were published in magazines.

== Early life ==
Acosta's parents were migrants to Cuba from the Canary Islands. Technically they were not immigrants, because both island groups were possessions of the Spanish Empire at the time.

He was born in a large house on Calzada de Tirry street, at the mouth of the bay, in Matanzas, Cuba. His primary and secondary schools were both in Matanzas.

As a young man, he worked as a telegraph operator for a Cuban railroad. Eventually, he rose through the ranks and became the director of the telegraph office. Between 1909 and 1920, Acosta acted as a director of the Telegraph offices of Matanzas and Havana.

Concurrently, while working at the telegraph offices, he was studying law at the University of Havana. In 1918, he graduated with a Doctorate in Civil Law.

In 1921, he became a public notary in Jagüey Grande. He lived most of his life in Jagüey Grande.

== Political activism and career in government ==
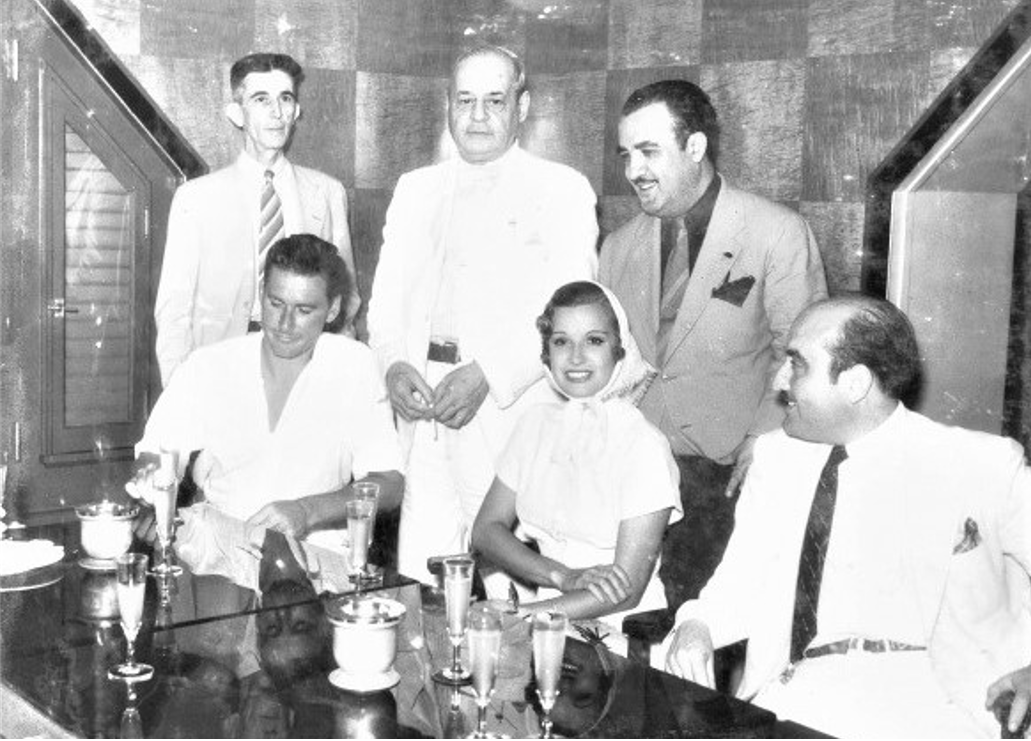
Agustín Acosta (top left) and Conrado Massaguer (top right) with Errol Flynn, his wife Lili Damita, and others in Rafael "Pappy" Valiente's Bacardi Club, which was an elite club hidden inside of the Bacardi Building in Havana. Pappy is pictured in the center of the frame.

Acosta was a member of the Minorista Group, one of the most influential group of revolutionary artists in Cuba, alongside his close friend Rubén Martínez Villena. Other members of the Minoristas included; Alejo Carpentier, Juan Marinello, Alberto Lamar, José Zacarías Tallet and Emilio Roig de Leuchsenring. Another prominent member of the Minoristas was Conrado Walter Massaguer, the owner of the magazines Social and Carteles. Many of the contributors to Social were Minoristas.

was active politically and spent long stretches in prison during the regime of Gerardo Machado.

In 1931, he published an open letter against Machado in Revista Bohemia, which sent him to prison for three weeks.

With the success of the Cuban Revolution of 1933, Machado was overthrown and Acosta was no longer classified as an enemy of the state.

From 1933 to 1934, Acosta served as the Provisional Governor of Matanzas.

During the Presidential administration of Carlos Mendieta, Acosta served as his cabinet secretary.

From 1936 to 1944, Acosta served as a Senator of the Republic of Cuba.

From 1936 to 1937, he was the president of the Cuban political party, the Partido Unión Nacionalista.

== Career as a poet ==
In 1913, 1914 and 1915, Acosta obtained "Natural Flowers" in the Floral Games held in Santiago de Cuba and Havana.

Together with Regino Boti and José Manuel Poveda he is one of the representatives of the lyrical renaissance that took place in Cuba before the 1920s. As a poet, his writing was marked by nationalist ideals pitted against US hegemony over the island. He was a member of the extinct National Academy of Arts and Letters. He wrote regularly for Cuban publications including;

- El Fígaro
- El Cubano Libre
- Social
- Carteles
- Letras
- Orto
- Diario de la Marina
- Las Antilas
- Ariel
- Archipiélago

=== Published works ===
- La Zafra (1926)
- Los camellos distantes (1936)
- Las islas desoladas (1943)
- Caminos de hierro (1963)
- El apóstol y su isla: poemas cubanos, (1965)
- Trigo de luna (1978)
- Poemas escogidos (1988)
- Última poesía (2005)

Some of his popular poems like "Las carretas en la noche" ("Carts in the Night") and "Mediodia en el Campo" ("Midday in the Country") appeared in La Zafra. He also wrote a number of essays on Jose Marti.

== Cuban Revolution and later life ==
After the Cuban Revolution, he was quickly ostracized by the communist government. In 1961, only a year after Fidel Castro took power, Acosta was replaced as the National Poet by Nicolás Guillén. Most of the magazines that Acosta had been published in were shuttered by the communist government, and Miguel Ángel Quevedo, the director of Bohemia – where Acosta had condemned Machado – was forced out and replaced by the Fidel hardliner Enrique de la Osa.

Acosta felt betrayed by Nicolás Guillén, as the two had once been friends from the same town. Guillén had once been enraptured by Acosta's poems, and the two men had at one time hosted poetry competitions together.

The new government also shut down the poetry readings and competitions that Acosta was involved with.

However, Acosta was already 73 years old in 1960, and considered too old to pose a threat to the Castro regime. His foster daughter Sara was evacuated from Cuba in Operation Peter Pan. He lived quietly for nine more years in Cuba.

Acosta only published a single work of poetry after the Cuban Revolution, Caminos de hierro (Roads of Iron), in 1963.

On May 17, 1971, when Acosta was 85 years old, he wrote to Guillén to ask him to intercede and help him leave Cuba:

"I am going to be 85 years old and I am ill (I am writing to you in bed and my wife is typing these words). I do not know, of course, how long I have left on earth. My eyesight is getting worse every day and this has me very worried. Perhaps if the trip takes place I will look for an oculist to prevent the advance of the disorders that almost always prevent me from reading and writing. I have arthrosis in my knees that prevents me from walking, she has the flu. The two of us are alone in bed and sick. We cannot go out to look for medicines and food, and we do not have anyone to help us because our relatives are far away and the private individuals either do not know our condition or, selfishly, want to ignore it. As you see, dear poet, the paintings are Goyaesque… You will decide whether or not we have reasons to want to be with our little daughter even if it were at the end of the world."

Guillén's response included:

"Perhaps I am not in the mood for this to happen, Agustín. I do not believe that at your age the hustle and bustle of a trip like the one you are planning is advisable."

Acosta was able to leave Cuba in 1972, and went into exile in the United States. He continued to publish poetry for the rest of his life.

Acosta's grandson, Nansen H. Tapanes, wrote in 2023:

"Here we cannot help but remember that phrase from that other eternal exile, José Martí: “And I will go through the world bleeding, but free." Was Agustín really free in his Miami exile? I do not know. From what my father told me many years later, facts belonging to the family and personal novel of the poet, I really come to doubt it."

He died in Miami in 1979.
