= Abril Lamarque =

Cuban caricaturist, artist, and magician (1904 - 1999)

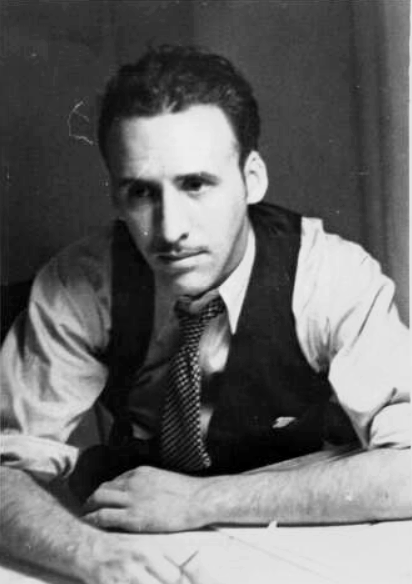
- Born: 28 August 1904; Banes, Cuba
- Died: 25 January 1999 (aged 94)
- Known for: Creator of the first Spanish language comic strip; Inventor of the radiocature; Inventor of the composacature

Eduardo Abril Lamarque was a Cuban and American caricaturist, cartoonist, artist, designer, and magazine publisher. He also engaged himself as a stage magician and as a music conductor. Lamarque was an innovator in the arts of typography, magazine layout and design, and caricature creation. He was the first person in the world to create, draw, and distribute a comic strip entirely in the Spanish language. Prior to this, Spanish language comic strips had only been translations of comics from other languages. In the 1920s, Lamarque was considered one of the top ten greatest cartoonists living in the United States. Lamarque also invented entirely new forms of art, such as his infamous radiocatures, genre forms of cartoons, and a new style of caricature he called the composacature. He is considered to be a follower of the Bauhaus movement.

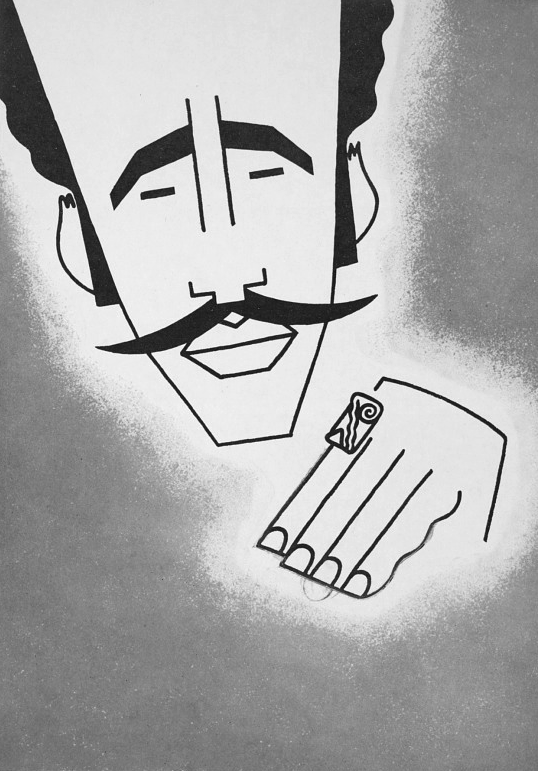
Abril Lamarque self portrait.

The historian Shawn McDaniel writes that: "No other Cuban has influenced the way Americans consume popular print culture more than Lamarque did." This statement places Lamarque on a high pedestal against other Cubans like Miguel Ángel Quevedo and Conrado Walter Massaguer.

Lamarque chose not to use the name 'Eduardo,' because that was also his uncle's name, and his uncle was also involved in the newspaper and magazine industry.

== Early life ==
As a child, Lamarque attended the Escuela Minerva, the first Montessori school in Cuba, which had been established by his aunt. Lamarque's father was a customs administrator in Oriente Province and the port of Antilla, Cuba.

In 1917, when Lamarque was twelve years old, his father placed him on board the SS Munamar of the Munson Steamship Line to study the English language and business administration in the city of Brooklyn. While living in Brooklyn, he attended the Public School 26 in the class of 1921.

He lived with a German-Jewish family in Bed-Stuy. The father of this household, Fred Fist, was a Linotypist who worked for the Brooklyn Standard Union. Lamarque studied the forms of typesetting and typeface design that Fist worked on for the newspaper.

English came quickly to him, and he went by the name of Edward Abril while earning money as a shoeshiner and newsboy. At nights, he would draw everything he saw on the streets of Brooklyn and its neighboring city, New York City, but focused mainly on faces and odd angles on ordinary objects.

== Career as an artist ==
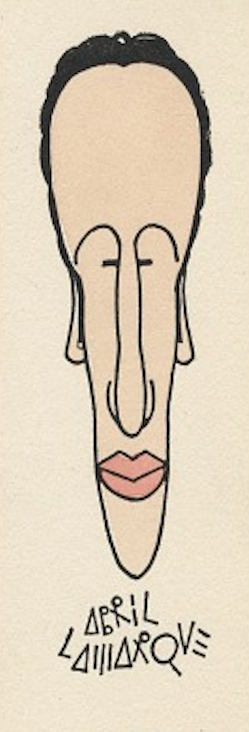
Self portrait caricature of Abril Lamarque.

=== Early art career ===
In 1919, at the age of 15, Lamarque's first cartoon was published in the New York World-Telegram and Evening Mail, in the Boy Scout section of that newspaper.

The Dance of the Millions suddenly collapsed in 1920. With the follow-on collapsing sugar market and economic crash in Cuba, Lamarque's parents could no longer afford his studies in America. In 1921, at the age of 17, Lamarque returned to Cuba to work as a deckhand on a banana boat based in Santiago de Cuba.

However, Lamarque was able to leave his job on the docks for a job as a sign painter and a traveling projectionist for a single movie that he took from town to town, featuring Rudolph Valentino.

Lamarque then was employed as an amateur graphic artist by his uncle, Eduardo Abril Amores, at Diario de Cuba. Eduardo had created this newspaper in 1917, and was at this point the most important newspaper in all of Cuba. In the Diario de Cuba, Lamarque engaged in political caricatures; mocking Mario García Menocal and critiquing US intervention. One of these caricatures almost got Lamarque arrested and/or killed, until the political figure he mocked learned that the artist was so young.

In 1922, Lamarque got a second job as a desk clerk at the Gran Hotel in Camagüey.

Diario de Cuba had an office on Nassau Street, Manhattan near the Brooklyn Bridge, and Lamarque regularly traveled between New York and Cuba. In 1923, at the age of 19, his comic strip Bla-Bla appeared in the New York Daily News, and was regularly published.

Also in 1923, Diario de Cuba promoted Lamarque to professional staff caricaturist and cartoonist. By 1924, Diario de Cuba assigned Lamarque to the New York bureau as a repórter gráfico - 'graphic reporter'.

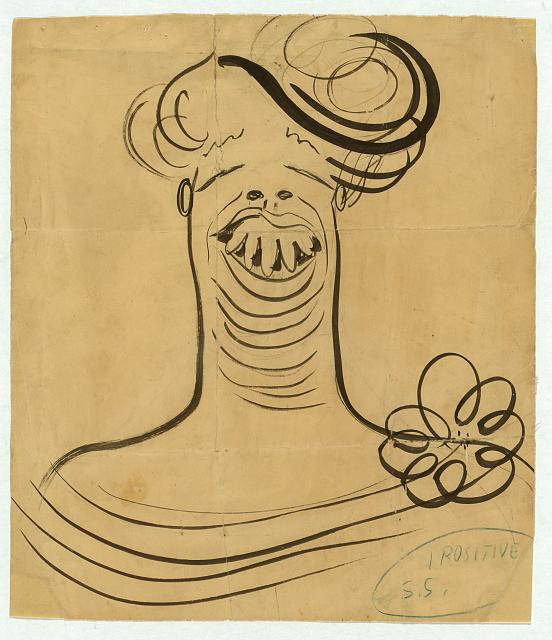
Caricature of Eleanor Roosevelt, drawn by Abril Lamarque in 1930, when she was the First Lady of New York.

Between 1923 and 1924, Lamarque was hired as a professional caricaturist and director of "The Week in Caricature" for the New York World-Telegram and Evening Mail, the same publication that had printed his very first cartoon. He also worked as a caricaturist for the New York Daily News, which had published Bla-Bla.

Later in 1924, Lamarque created the 'OK Advertising Service,' in Camagüey. This advertising service created campaigns for clothing stores, tobacco brands, and Bacardi.

He also worked for the Santiago-based magazine Pelele as an artist.

In both Santiago and Manzanillo, Lamarque performed live caricature shows. Later, he participated in the Salón de Humoristas, where he first met Conrado Walter Massaguer, Enrique García Cabrera, Enrique Riveron, Eduardo Abela, José Manuel Acosta, Ramón Arroyo Cisneros, Rafael Blanco, and Sirio.

=== Monguito ===
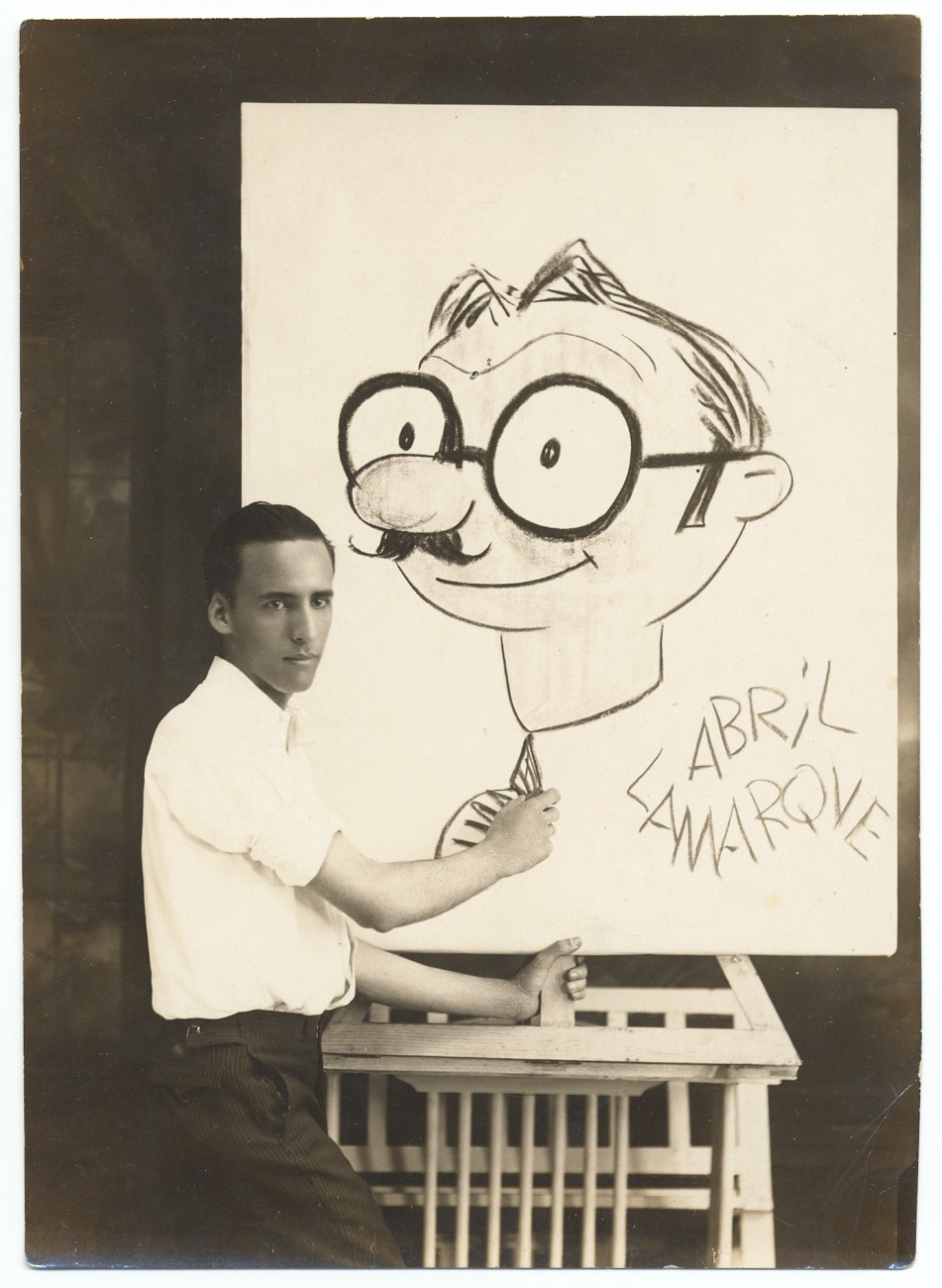
Abril Lamarque standing next to one of his drawings, the groundbreaking Spanish character named "Monguito."

In 1925, Lamarque created Monguito, the first comic strip in the world ever published entirely in the Spanish language. Lamarque's groundbreaking comic strip ran from 1925 to 1933 in the daily newspapers of Latin America. Monguito was distributed by the United Feature Syndicate throughout both Latin America and the United States. Over 500 issues of Monguito were published daily in 26 newspapers.

Monguito was published in Santiago de Cuba, Havana, Camagüey, New York City, Los Angeles, Tampa, Tampico, San Juan, Guatemala City, San Salvador, Bogotá, Santiago de Chile, Buenos Aires, and Manila.

The character of Monguito Petit Pois was a "hapless soul, fully dressed in a business suit and hat, who kept getting into tricky situations." In a similar vein to Basil Fawlty, Monguito worked in the comics as a hotel desk clerk, and Lamarque drew on his own experiences from the Gran Hotel to inform this.

Monguito, while it was distributed across the whole of the Latin American world (including the Philippines), was written specifically for the people of Santiago de Cuba, who instantly recognized the person the character most accurately represented. Because Monguito was designed for the people of Santiago, this comic strip did not care about regional politics in the same way as other cartoons of this era.

In 1925, Lamarque published a booklet called Primer Curso de Caricaturas, which was an instructional notebook teaching the craft of cartooning.

=== Invention of Radiocature ===
In April 1925, Lamarque created Radiocatures - which were caricatures designed specifically for the radio and radio shows. This art form was composed of a transmitting chart, which was a grid of empty squares that would be published in the New York World-Telegram and Evening Mail - and a set of instructions written by Lamarque would be read out on the radio station WOR by the radio journalist Warren Nolan.

Warren Nolan said of the invention:

"This is the first time in history that a newspaper has broadcast a caricature over the radio, the first time that a noted artist has shared the actual technique of his craftmanship with his patrons. It may mean that children will be drawing their own comics soon, that photographs of friends may be sent in outline by a similar device, that the man who is talking to you over the radio may first be drawn by you and then heard. No one can tell just now what it will mean. They told Columbus the world was flat."

Student newspapers at the campuses of the University of Iowa, University of Wisconsin–Madison, University of Notre Dame, and Dartmouth College also published the transmitting charts in their pages, and university students on these campuses and others enjoyed participating in Lamarque's radiocatures.

The Diario de Cuba also published transmitting charts, alongside a dozen other Cuban newspapers, in their nationalism supporting the fact that this was a wholly Cuban invention.

It should be noted here that "radiocatures" and "radiocaturas" were two different and distinct inventions - the latter being Lamarque's ability to describe famous CMQ (Cuba) radio personalities with such vivid description that the listener would be able to "see" them for the first time hearing only Lamarque's words.

=== Career as Art Director ===
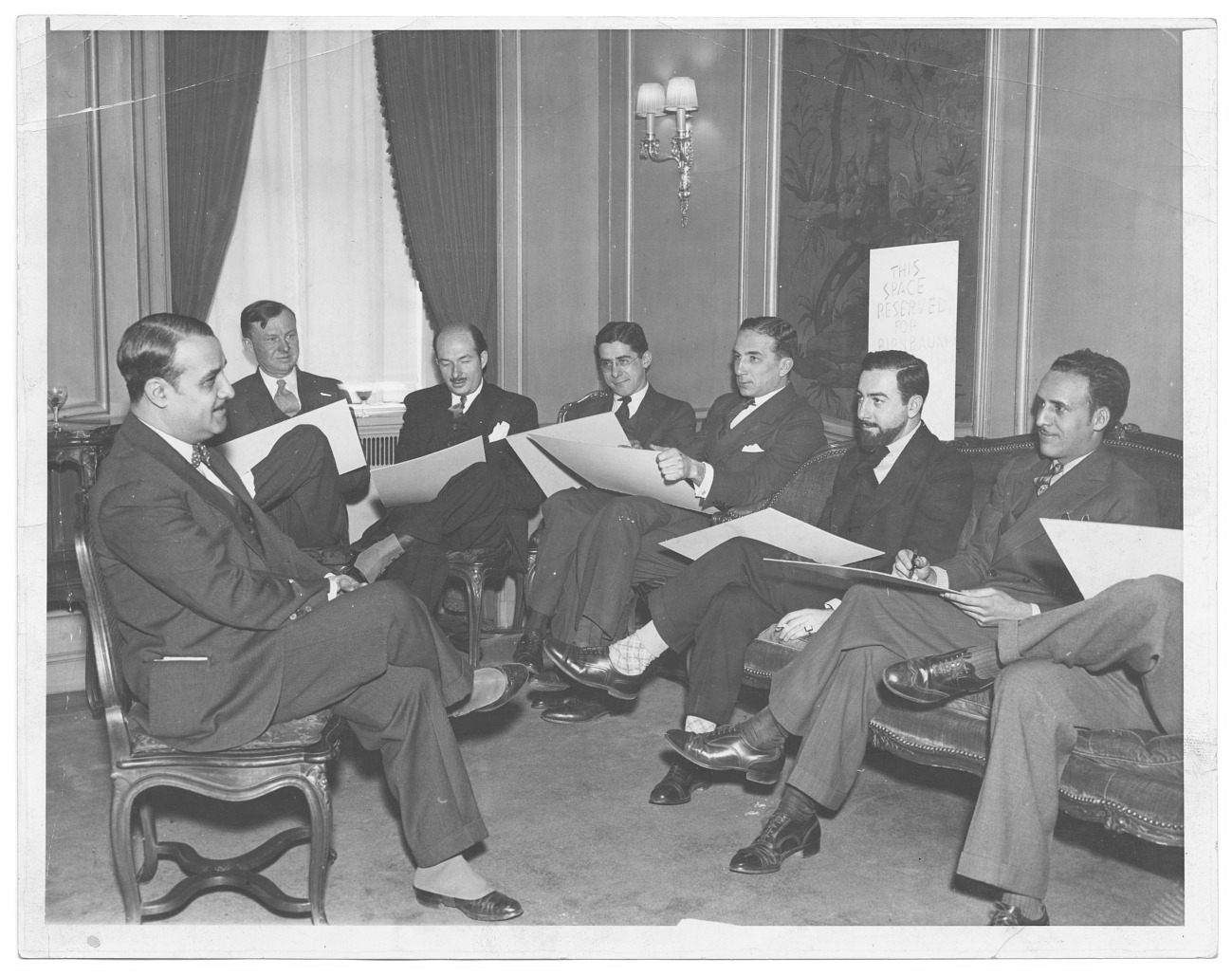
Group of caricaturists drawing portraits of Conrado Massaguer. Pictured here from left to right: Conrado Massaguer, Alfred Frueh; Xavier Cugat; Alex Gard; Sam Berman; Al Hirschfeld; and Abril Lamarque.

In 1927, at the age of 23, Lamarque became employed as the first art director employed by Dell Publishing. He worked in this office for 14 years. In this capacity, he oversaw the design, layout, photography, and art direction for over 20 popular magazines. Lamarque was consequently in this role, the first art director ever to oversee;

- Ballyhoo
- Film Fun
- I Confess
- Modern Screen
- Popular Song
- War Stories
- Spotlight
- Theatrical Page
- Other publications

As the art director for Dell Publishing, Lamarque drew caricatures and portraits of Gloria Swanson, Charlie Chaplin, Doug Fairbanks, Rudolph Valentino, Buster Keaton, John Barrymore, Morris Gest, Mary Pickford, Dolores del Río, Groucho Marx, and Joan Crawford.

While performing in this role, Lamarque also designed greeting cards. In the Christmas season of 1930, he is quoted as having said: "It isn't the size of the card that counts, but the spirit with which it's sent."

When Abril left his position at Dell Publishing, it was taken over by Otto Storch.

From 1940 to 1941, Lamarque established his first design firm called 'Abril Lamarque Creations." Here, Lamarque designed jewelry, accessories, and household items. One of these was called the pallettray, a serving tray made to look like an art palette.

Between 1941 and 1946, Lamarque served as the first art director for the Sunday editions of;

- The New York Times Magazine
- The New York Times Book Review

Under the stewardship of his boss Lester Markel, Lamarque completely redesigned the New York Times Magazine from its older tabloid format into the modern magazine format that is still used today.

Lamarque also designed and redesigned throughout his career;

- The American Weekly
- New York Daily News
- Metropolitan Life
- This Week
- Popular Science
- U.S. News & World Report

In 1948, Lamarque established a graphic arts studio in New York City. Out of this studio, he managed advertising, design, and publication campaigns for;

- Bacardi
- Metropolitan Life Insurance Company
- Consolidated Edison
- Ericsson
- General Cable
- Berlitz Corporation
- Lipton
- Monsanto
- Other companies

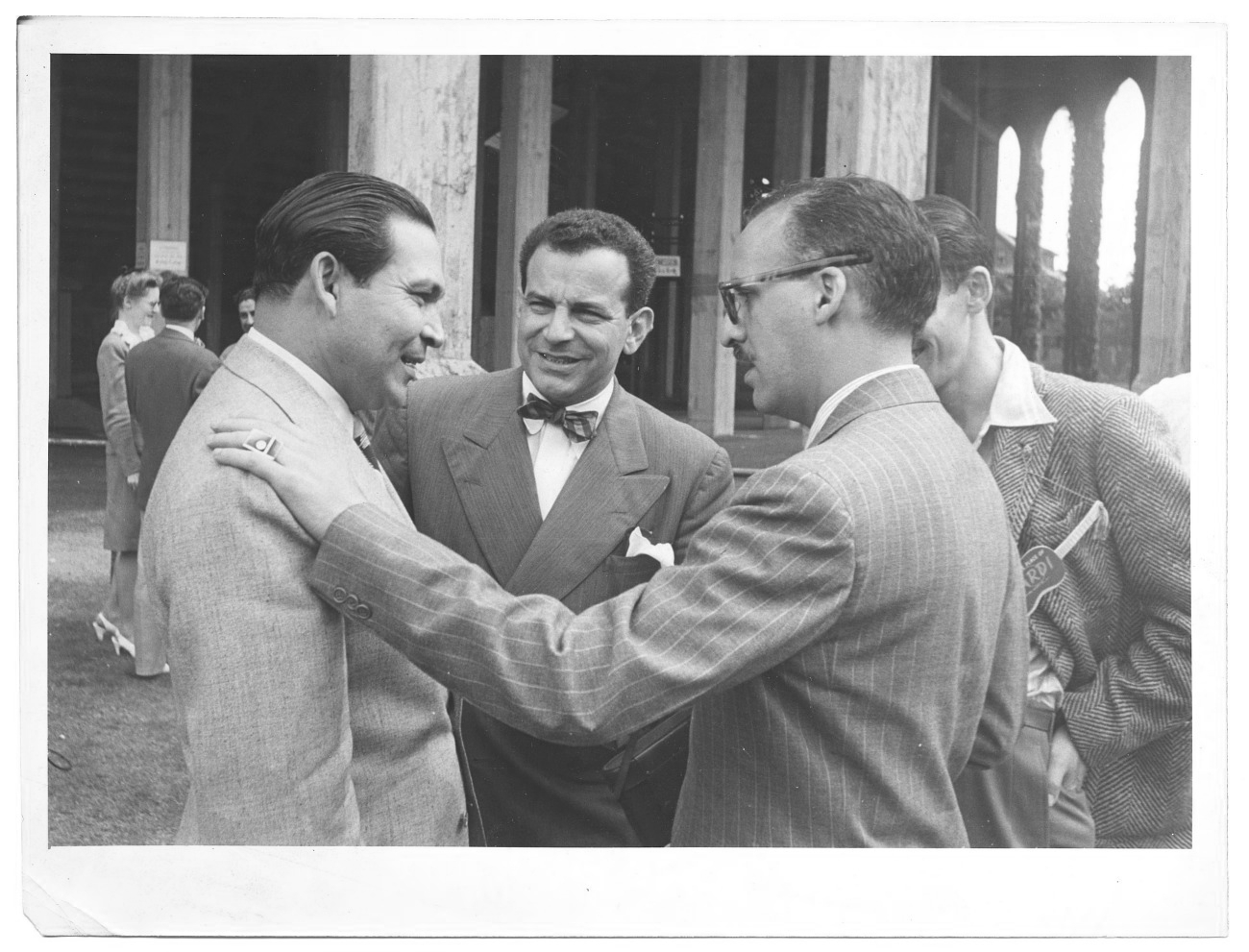
Abril Lamarque pictured here studying Fulgencio Batista's face. Pictured from left to right: Batista, Paul Catalá, and Abril Lamarque.

Also in 1948, his design for the American Red Cross poster was selected for the national annual Red Cross poster campaign.

Lamarque was also a successful lecturer of a curriculum that he called Editorial Layout Workshops, to teach his Bauhaus-inspired guidelines for page design. He taught these courses on his own and also as a lecturer for the Crowell Collier Institute, and taught in cities and towns across North America.

From 1958 to 1963, Lamarque taught design at the New York University School of Continuing Education. Later, he taught at the Oklahoma State University School of Journalism.

Lamarque belonged to the Dutch Treat Club, the Society of Illustrators, the New York University Club, and the Art Directors Club of New York. Lamarque was also heavily involved in the Comite pro Cuba and the Cuban Society of Artists.

Lamarque also conducted at least one musical performance that was printed onto vinyl; "Abril Lamarque Conducts Sonatas for Lovin' Swingers."

== Career as a magician ==
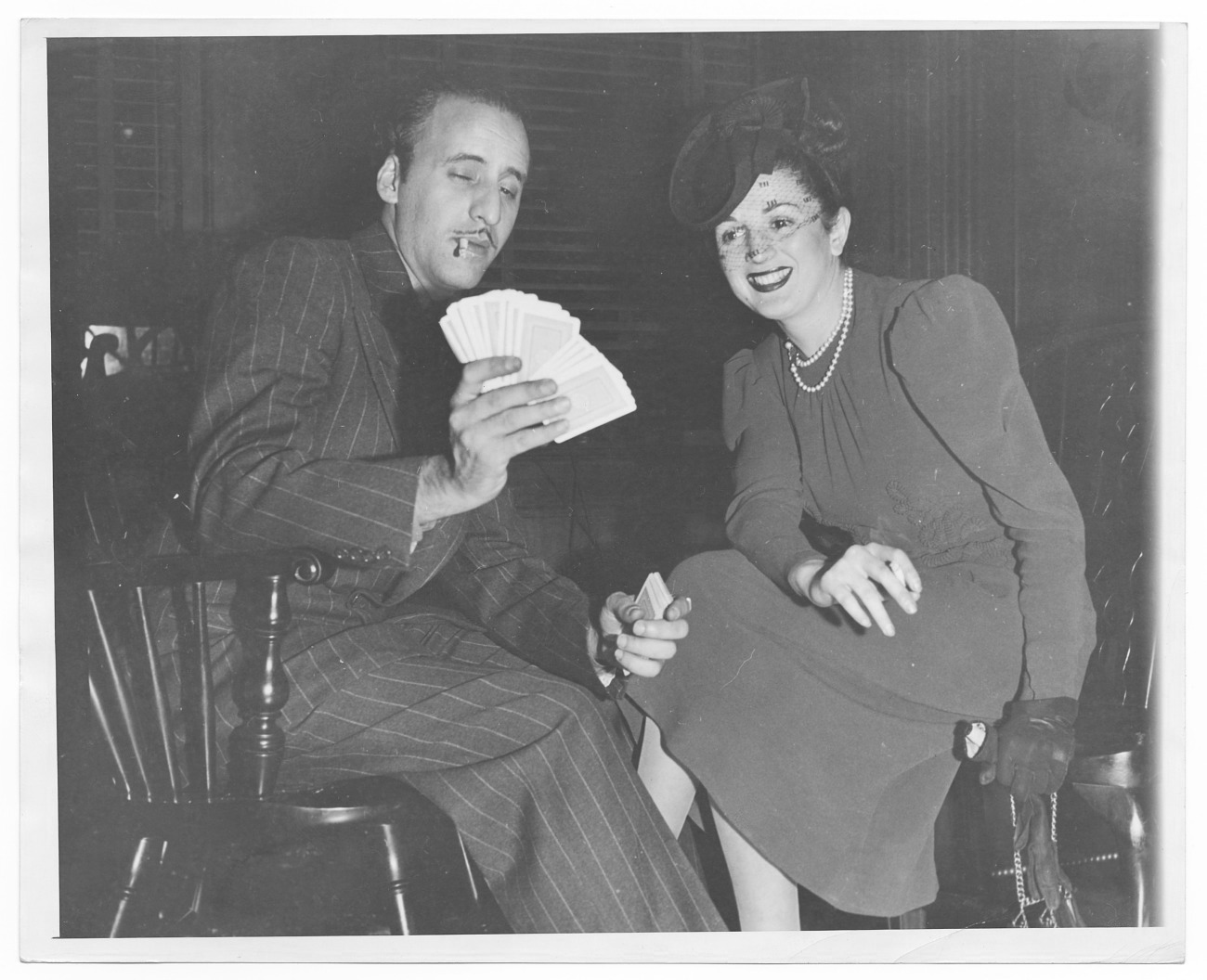
Abril Lamarque performing a card trick for an audience member at one of his magic shows.

Lamarque's career in the art of illusion was a pastime for him - he remained gainfully employed in the magazine business, but became a good enough magician to perform for public audiences beginning in the 1930s. His editor and friend Max Batchelder would often help him with arranging gigs as a magician. Lamarque joined Parent Assembly 1 of the Society of American Magicians in 1933.

Some of Lamarque's magic performances were hosted in adult-themed burlesque bars and the Playboy Club, and his female assistants were not always fully clothed, as evidenced in certain photographs in the Smithsonian archives, such as this one (content warning): https://www.aaa.si.edu/collections/items/detail/abril-lamarque-performing-magic-tricks-14420

However, Lamarque also performed magic for people of all ages, and did not rely solely on the assistance of a topless woman. He performed traditional card tricks. He also performed at at least one children's party. He performed for the annual Christmas party of the Society of Illustrators.

Lamarque was also a regular contributor to Hugard's Magic Monthly, creating graphic art and drawings for articles such as "How to Save Face After Laying an Egg," and "Foiling the Gremlins."
