= Rafael Valiente =

Bacardi's first Brand Ambassador

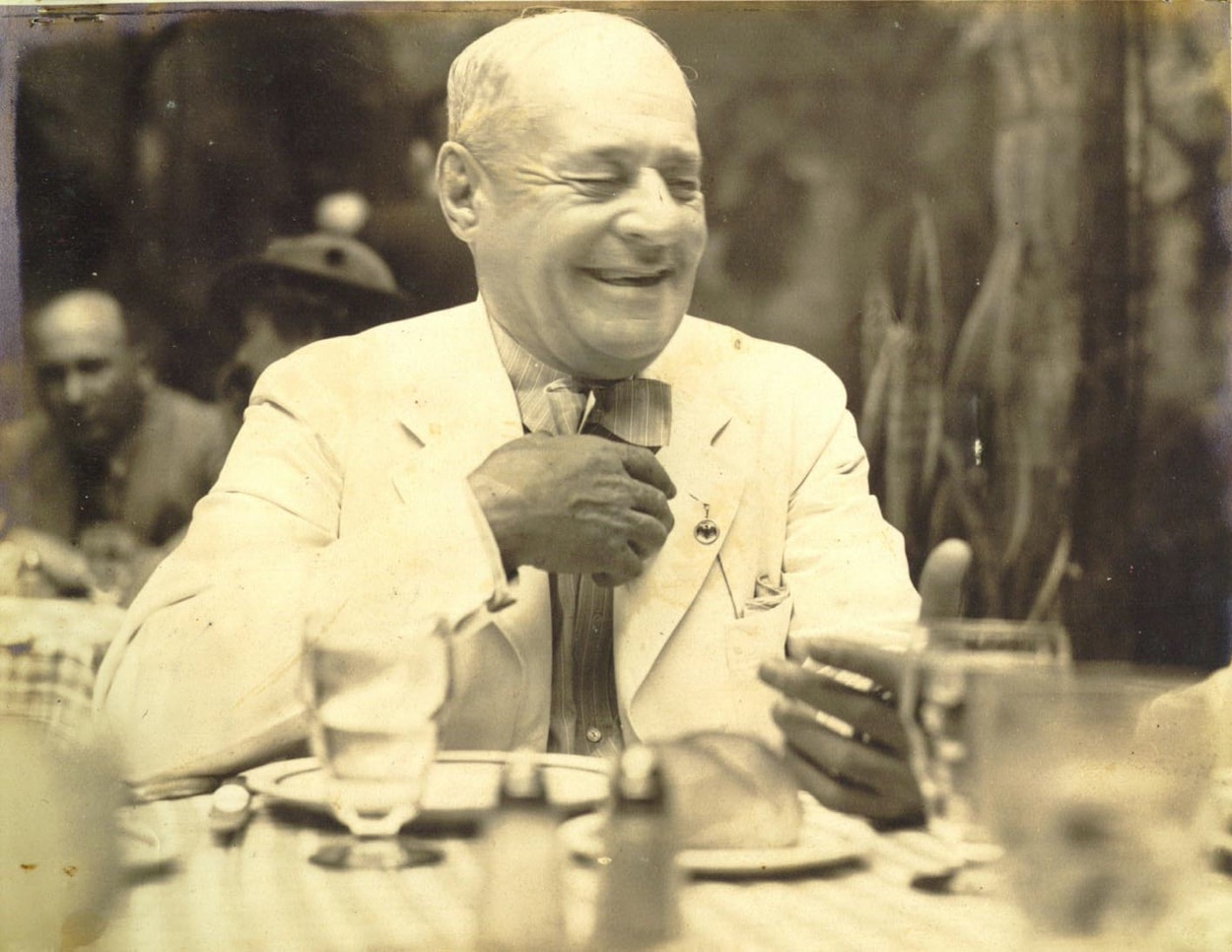
- Valiente at the Bacardí Building in Havana, photographed in the 1930s.
- Other names: Pappy Valiente; Papi Valiente
- Occupations: Bartender; brand ambassador
- Known for: First brand ambassador for Bacardí rum

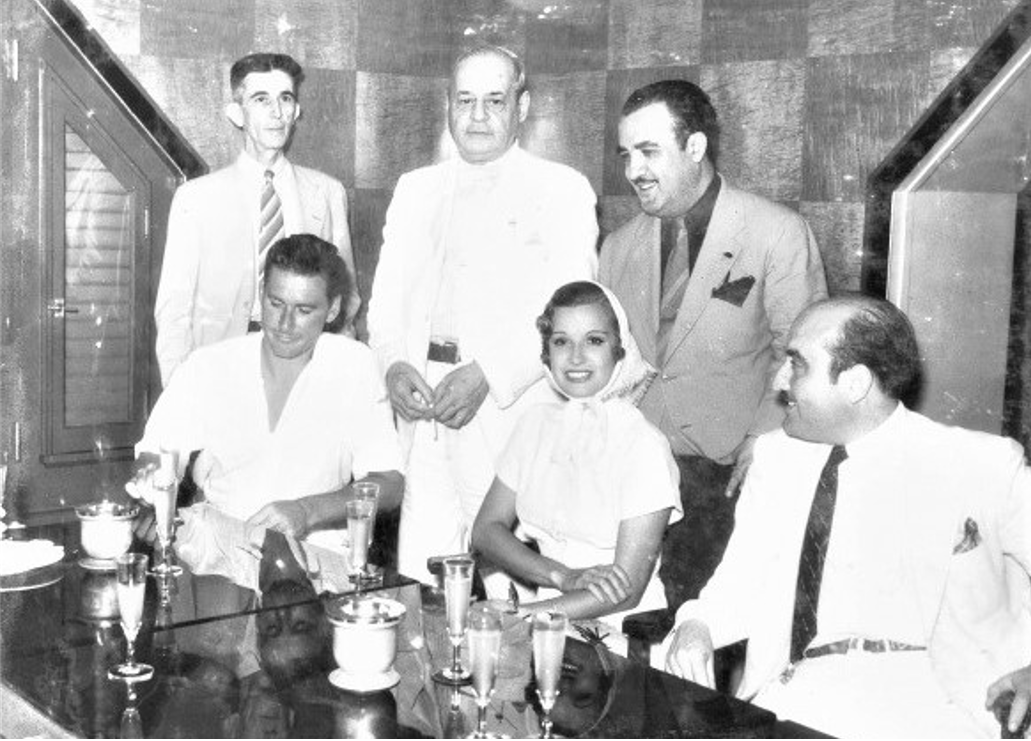
Errol Flynn and his wife Lili Damita enjoy a drink with Conrado Walter Massaguer, Agustín Acosta, and others in Pappy Valiente's Bacardi Club at the Bacardi Building in Havana. Pappy is pictured in the center of the photograph.

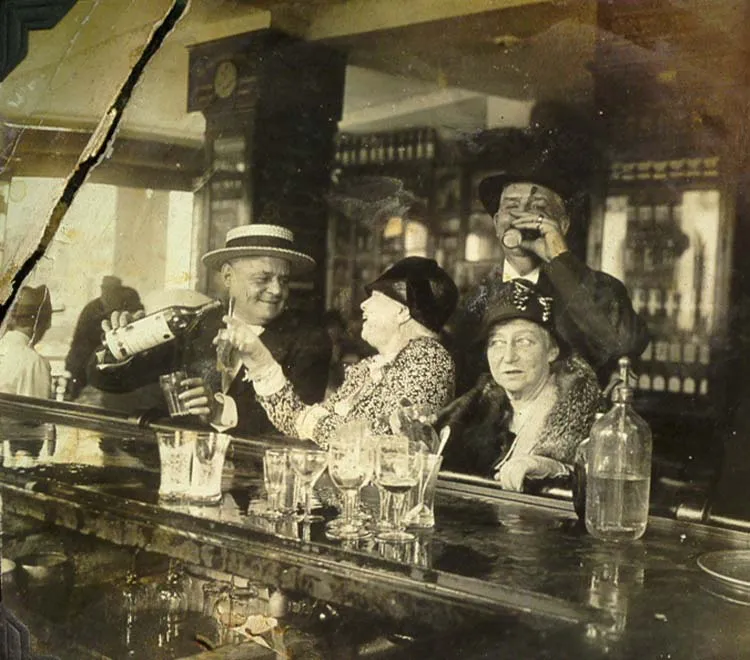
Pappy (left) serving a drink to American tourist Miss Alice Maxwell in the company of Mr. and Mrs. Car at Sloppy Joe's Bar in Havana, 1930s.

Rafael "Pappy" Valiente Echevarría (Papi Valiente) was a Cuban bartender who worked for Bacardí and the company’s first brand ambassador.

== History ==
During the Prohibition in the United States, the sale of alcoholic beverages was still legal in Cuba. Pappy, in his trademark white linen suit, would often greet American tourists at the airport or steamship docks with a glass of alcohol. Pappy greeted and entertained many famous American vagabonds, celebrities, tourists, mafiosos, politicians, artists, and socialites, among others, introducing many of them to the Daiquiri the moment they landed in Cuba. For the upper echelons of the global holiday-seeking elite, Pappy would often give private guided tours of Havana, before bringing his guests to the infamous "Bacardi Club," which was a secret VIP-only bar on the mezzanine level of the Bacardi Building, the first skyscraper in Havana. While Pappy was certainly focused on foreign customers in order to increase Bacardi's reputation and revenue base in foreign and untapped markets, Pappy also made sure to entertain Cuba's local elite socialite class.

== Legacy ==
Valiente has been invoked in modern Bacardí brand storytelling as an early example of direct-to-consumer engagement.
