= José Manuel Acosta Bello =

Cuban artist (1895 -1973)

José Manuel Acosta
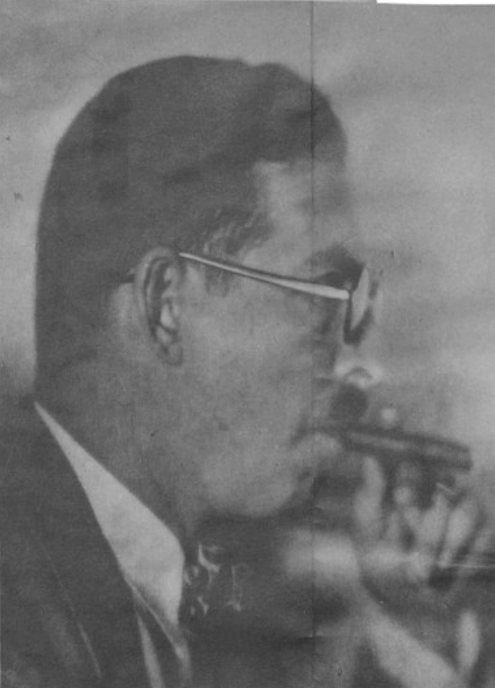
- Born: December 2, 1895; Matanzas, Cuba
- Died: February 28, 1973 (aged 77); Havana

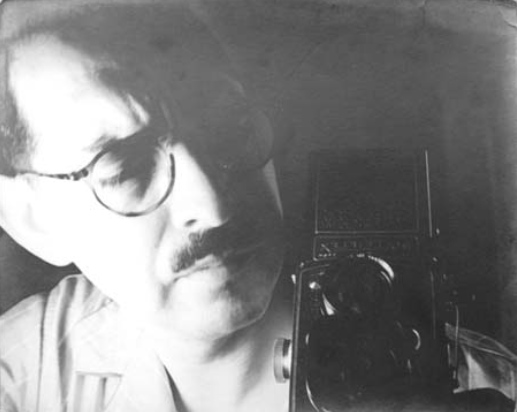
José Manuel Acosta Bello self portrait, circa 1935.

José Manuel Acosta y Bello was a Cuban painter, photographer, cartoonist, sculptor, and artist.

== Biography ==
He graduated with first letters from a Catholic Seminary. After graduating, he became a clerk of an "old style" business house, commission agent, bookkeeper, used car salesman, alcohol tax inspector, and failed business shareholder.

His brother was the famous Cuban poet Agustín Acosta Bello - who was the National Poet of Cuba before the Cuban Revolution. Acosta would often illustrate his brother's poems that would appear in magazines like Social and Carteles. By the age of 35, he had submitted at least 35 drawings to Conrado Massaguer to be reviewed and printed in Social alongside his brother's work.

In 1930, Acosta traveled to New York City to work out of the Social bureau there. He moved into residence on Riverside Drive in Manhattan. From New York, he contributed images of New York, and images of modern airplanes for Social.

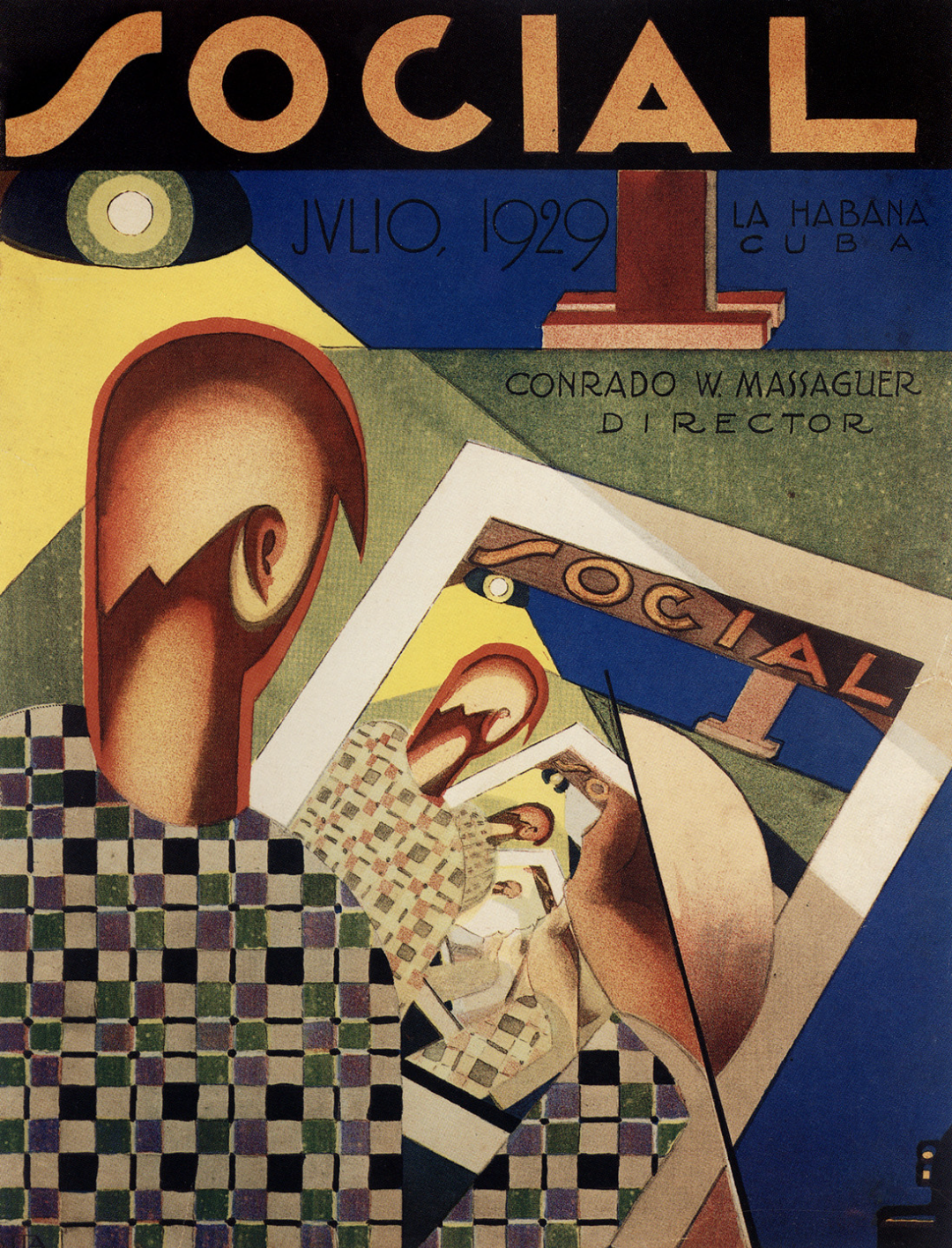
Cover of Social drawn by Acosta.

Acosta also helped Massaguer design some of the covers of Social.

Acosta was a great personal friend of José Zacarías Tallet, and also illustrated many of his poems.

He illustrated a book for someone who went by the moniker of "The Fichista."

The magazine Social wrote of Acosta, that he had:

"a quick mind in the conception and execution of ideas, an absolute command of the technique of his profession, which qualifies him for the highest endeavors. Oh! and some "frescoes", unfortunately gone, living only in the memory of the very few who had the opportunity to admire and enjoy them. And a physical sciatica that he hopes to cure in cold climates."

== Career as a photographer ==
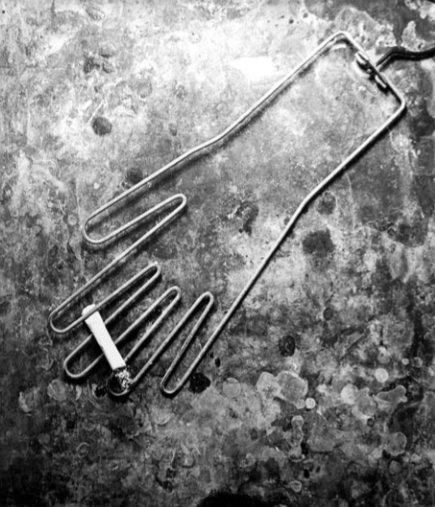
José Manuel Acosta Bello captured this artistic photograph, the original is in the National Cuban archives

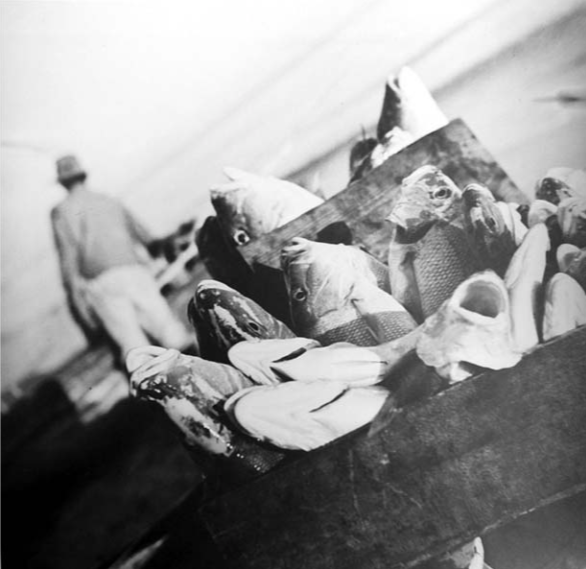
José Manuel Acosta Bello captured this image of fish and a man at a beach in Cuba

The writer and photographer Nelson Ramírez de Arellano of the Cuban magazine Revolución y Cultura, a Cuban state-sponsored magazine dedicated to glorifying the Cuban Revolution, writes of Acosta:

"...the pioneering work of José Manuel Acosta stands for its own right as a culminating point and vortex generator of the entire avant-garde [of Cuba], a man with a singular talent... his understanding of the conventional limits of photography and his ability to break them... although his career as a photographer was relatively short, if was very fruitful, and in all his work we can see the presence of a photographer of the constructivist avant-garde on par with its greatest examples. That is to say, there is not a single shot in any of his negatives that does not indicate the intention to revolutionize photographic composition and visual experimentation, there is not a minute of rest for a candid shot and an easy composition. We could randomly select any of his negatives... and we will always appreciate the same creative rigor that allows me to conclude that this photographer had a very clear conscience of his position in the world as an artist and of the relevance of his work and his artistic criteria."
