= Eduardo Abril Amores =

- Eduardo Augusto Angel Armenhol Abril Amores
- Born: December 22, 1884; Baracoa, Cuba
- Died: December 28, 1961; Santiago de Cuba
- Other names: "decano del periodismo"

Eduardo Abril Amores was a Cuban newspaper publisher, journalist, essayist, and amateur musician. On December 1, 1917, Abril Amores created the Santiago de Cuba-based newspaper Diario de Cuba. Historians consider this newspaper the most important daily newspaper in Cuba prior to the success of the Cuban Revolution of 1959.

Yamil Sanchez Castellanos of the Spanish language magazine Caliban writes that Abril Amores was:

"a distinguished figure in Cuban journalism and one of the most hard-working intellectuals of the city of Santiago de Cuba during the Republic."

The journalist Eric Caraballoso of On Cuba News writes that:

"...Eduardo Abril Amores would have a deep impact on the society of Santiago de Cuba and all of eastern Cuba in the first half of the 20th century... Eduardo Abril Amores was known as the dean of journalism in Santiago in the first decades of the 20th century. This is no small feat. In a land so fertile in journalists and writers since colonial times, earning such a distinction undoubtedly reveals the respect and admiration he has earned among colleagues and readers."

Abril Amores hired his nephew, Abril Lamarque as an artist for Diario de Cuba. Lamarque engaged in political caricatures; mocking Mario García Menocal and critiquing US intervention. One of these caricatures almost got Lamarque arrested and/or killed, until the political figure he mocked learned that the artist was so young.
