= Social (magazine) =

Cuban magazine prior to the Cuban Revolution

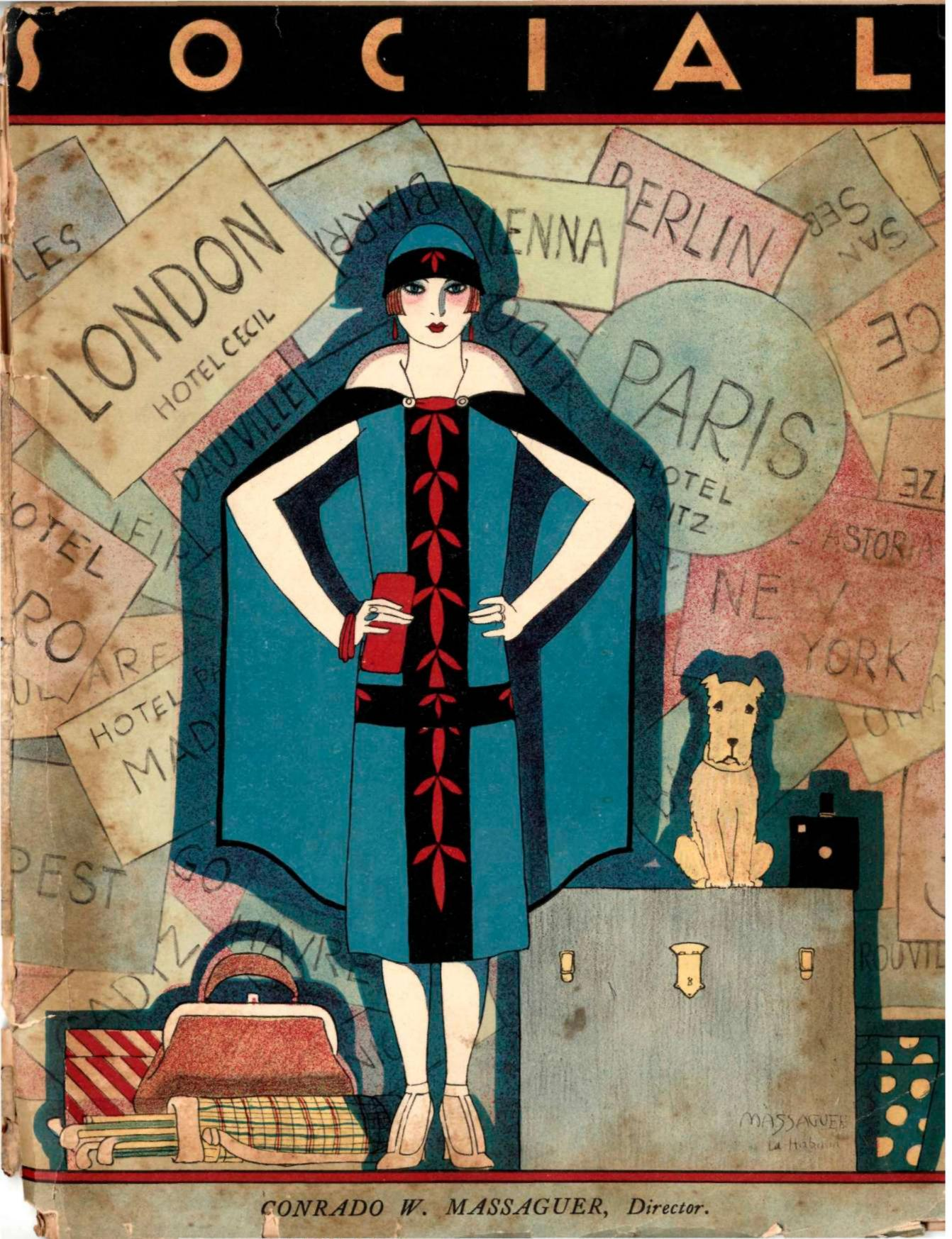
Cover of Social, October 1924

Social was a Cuban magazine created by the brothers Conrado Walter Massaguer and Oscar H. Massaguer, and was one of the most important magazines in Cuba in the early half of the twentieth century. Through this magazine, Cuba was introduced to the Art Deco movement. Social was the first magazine in the world to use photolithographic printing.

This magazine was in operation from 1916 to 1938, with periods of non-production while certain contributors and directors went into exile and prison at various times.

Social set cultural trends, not only in the fashion of Cuba, but in art, politics, and Cuban identity. Social catered to a certain aesthetic in Cuba – that of the sophisticated elite socialite – but Conrado Massaguer would also use this magazine to ridicule and jibe against that same class of society when he found their personalities worthy of his contempt.

In Social, readers could find a variety of content, including short stories, avant-garde poetry, art reviews, philosophical essays, and serialized novels, as well as articles on interior design, haute couture, and fashion. Occasionally, the magazine also featured reports on sports such as motor racing, rowing, tennis, and horse riding. The cultural promotion efforts of both Massaguer and Emilio Roig de Leuchsenring are evident in the magazine. Notably, this period overlaps with their involvement in the Minorista Group.

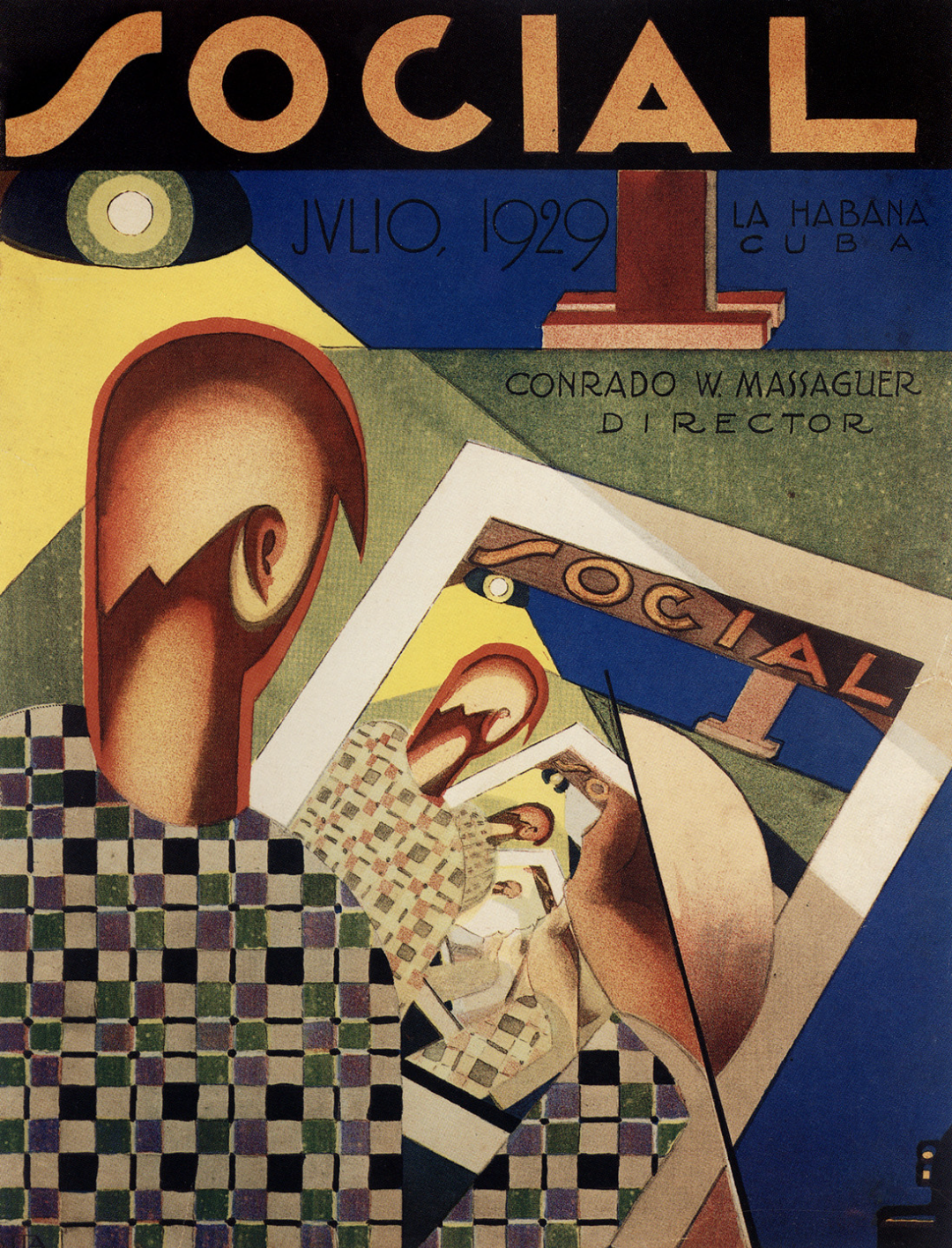
Cover of Social, July 1929

The majority of contributors to this magazine, including the founding brothers of the magazine, were members of the Minoristas, which was then at the forefront of the country's intellectual life. Many contributors were devoted members of the group, leading some experts to consider Social as the cultural voice of the Minoristas. However, Social was not officially connected this group.

== Notable contributors ==
- Rafael Angel Suris
- Enrique Garcia Cabrera
- Alejo Carpentier
- Agustín Acosta Bello
- José Manuel Acosta Bello
- Oscar H. Massaguer
- Conrado Walter Massaguer
- Alfredo T. Quilez
- Emilio Roig de Leuchsenring
- Francisco Diez
- Arturo Montori
- Arturo Alfonso Roselló
- Federico Ibarzabal
- Juan Marinello
