= Agustín Acosta (footballer) =

Uruguayan footballer (born 2001)

Personal information
- Full name: Agustín Acosta Bentancourt
- Date of birth: 17 February 2001 (age 25)
- Place of birth: Montevideo, Uruguay
- Height: 1.78 m (5 ft 10 in)
- Positions: Left-back; left midfielder

Team information
- Current team: Atenas
- Number: 16

Youth career
- Rentistas

Senior career*
Years	Team	Apps	(Gls)
2020–2022	Rentistas	49	(0)
2023–2025	Sud América	24	(1)
2025	Uruguay Montevideo	24	(0)
2026–	Atenas	0	(0)
- * Club domestic league appearances and goals as of 18 March 2026

Agustín Acosta Bentancourt (born 17 February 2001) is a Uruguayan professional footballer who plays for Uruguayan Segunda División club Atenas. Primarily a left-back, he can also play as a left midfielder.

== Career ==
Acosta is a youth academy graduate of Rentistas. He made his professional debut for the club on 18 October 2020 in a 1–2 league defeat against Liverpool Montevideo.

Acosta is a Uruguayan youth international. He is currently a member of Uruguay under-20 team.

== Career statistics ==
As of 27 August 2022

Club	Season	League			Cup		Continental		Other		Total	
Club	Season	Division	Apps	Goals	Apps	Goals	Apps	Goals	Apps	Goals	Apps	Goals
Rentistas	2020	Uruguayan Primera División	11	0	—		—		2 (Note: Appearances in Primera División playoffs.)	0	13	0
Rentistas	2021	Uruguayan Primera División	24	0	—		3 (Note: Appearances in Copa Libertadores.)	0	—		27	0
Rentistas	2022	Uruguayan Primera División	11	0	0	0	—		—		11	0
Career total			46	0	0	0	3	0	2	0	51	0
