= El Cubano Libre =

El Cubano Libre (English: The Free Cuban) was the paper that was established by Che Guevara during the midst of the Cuban Revolution. It was used as counter-propaganda to the Batista dictatorship and to inform the Cuban people about the mission of the July 26 Movement.

== Origins ==
"As for the dissemination of our ideas, first we started a small newspaper, El Cubano Libre, in memory of those heroes of the jungle. Three or four issues came out under my directorship; it was later edited by Luis Orlando Rodriguez, and subsequently by Carlos Franqui, who gave it new impetus. We had a mimeograph machine brought up to us from the cities, on which the paper was printed."

— Che Guevara, Episodes of the Cuban Revolutionary War

El Cubano Libre was established by Guevara in November 1957 in the Sierra Maestra. Guevara took the name from a paper published by Cuban patriots during the independence wars against Spanish colonialism in the 19th century.
