= Andrés García Benítez =

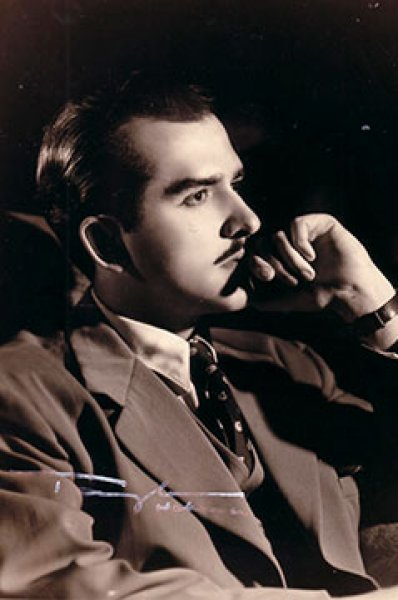
- Born: July 10, 1916; Holguín, Cuba
- Died: 1981 (aged 64–65); Havana
- Awards: Juan Gualberto Gómez

Andrés García Benítez (1916–1981) was one of the most important Cuban illustrators in the first half of the twentieth century. He was an artist and scenic designer whose works and notoriety existed for several decades before the Cuban Revolution, and survive into the modern era. After the revolution, he took working gigs in Spain and Puerto Rico. Many of his works were signed "Andrés."

Benítez's works are regularly listed and valued on the auction market, such as the 2020 auction sale for US$6,390 at Sotheby's New York. Many of his works are still exhibited in galleries. The website Cuban Art News writes of his work:

"Given the variety and richness of his art, it is easy to imagine García Benítez as a tireless creative machine, an artist possessed of a powerful and inexhaustible talent that continues to delight, astonish, and seduce us after 100 years."

== Career ==
=== Painter and illustrator ===
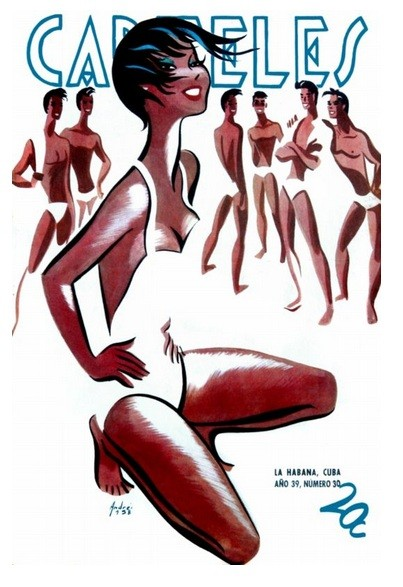
Cover of the magazine Carteles, painted by García Benítez, who greatly promoted the Afro-Cuban identity.

Benítez had only completed two years of high school in Holguín before informing his father, the Don Saturnio Garcia Zaballa, that he was going to drop out of school to pursue the life of a professional artist. Benítez had no professional training as an artist in the beginning of his career, and largely taught himself the craft.

By 1932, when he was only 16 years old, Benítez had already sold his first paintings, had his first art show, and had been hired by Alfredo T. Quiléz to draft covers for Carteles, one of the most popular magazines in Cuba. His first submissions were sent by mail.

In August 1936, Benítez was promoted to the position of official designer for Carteles. It is notable that his work defines the second phase of Cuban folk art, following the first phase art of Víctor Patricio de Landaluze.

Benítez worked as a graphic artist and illustrator for Carteles and Vanidades for over twenty years, until 1961, when the magazine industry in Cuba was completely shuttered by the Castro regime.

=== Performing arts ===
In June 1942, Benítez designed the set for the production of La Comedia de la felicidad de Everinoff, a play commissioned by Luis Martínez Allende. He also designed scenery and sets for the Havana theatre productions of Prometeo, Talía, Las Máscaras and others. In Holguín, he also designed the production of the Tropicana Cabaret. More notably, he designed the productions of Doña Rosita the Spinster, The Shoemaker's Prodigious Wife, Electra Garrigó, and Romeo and Juliet.

Benítez collaborated with maestro Ramiro Guerra on the ballet productions of Havana 1830, El Milagro de Anaquillé, and Liborio y esperanza. In 1948, he went into a brief collaboration with Alicia Alonso.

Benítez designed productions for the Tropicana Club and the Tropicana Cabaret, the Cabaret Parisien, and the Hotel Capri. He also designed the costumes for Esther Borja, Elena Burke, Merceditas Valdés, and Luis Carbonell.
