= Sam Berman =

American caricaturist (1907–1995)

Berman's caricature of bandleader-vocalist Eddy Howard for NBC's 1947 promotional book, NBC Parade of Stars as Seen by Sam Berman: As Heard over Your Favorite NBC Station

Sam Berman (July 27, 1907 – August 11, 1995) was an American caricaturist who between the 1930s and 1950s was one of the country's most notable and influential illustrators.

== Early career ==
Berman was in high school when he began drawing cartoons for the Hartford Courant. He went to New York to study art and then was given a position as a staff cartoonist for the Newark Star Eagle. During the 1930s his political cartoons were published in color in Collier's.

In 1933, he and E. Simms Campbell co-created Esky, the famed mascot of Esquire magazine, who featured on the monthly's covers for several years. Later in the decade, Berman worked for Esquire's current-affairs counterpart Ken, doing a series of caricatures of political figures of the era comparing them to animals.

== Films ==
He designed titles for Nothing Sacred (1937) and other films of the 1930s. His murals graced the walls of the Café Society club in Greenwich Village, and he illustrated Mark Hellinger's syndicated newspaper column, "Goin' to Town", throughout the 1930s and the 1940s. During World War II, he did a series depicting Nazi leaders. He worked with the Office of Strategic Services (OSS) in India. In 1945, as an OSS Presentation Branch graphic designer, he was attached to the UN Secretariat in San Francisco.

== Radio ==
Robert Merrill, as caricatured by Sam Berman for NBC's 1947 promotional portfolio.

After World War II, he made art for advertising agencies and created caricatures of leading radio performers for NBC's promotion, The NBC Parade of Stars as Seen by Sam Berman: As Heard over Your Favorite NBC Station (1947), which had a print run of 5 million. With a tight deadline, he created caricatures of NBC's most popular radio personalities and shows, each printed on a separate 6"x7" card, and inserted in a green vinyl slipcase. The set of 56 caricatures included Fred Allen, Jack Benny, Edgar Bergen and Charlie McCarthy, Milton Berle, George Burns and Gracie Allen, Judy Canova, Eddie Cantor, Jerry Colonna, Dennis Day, Bob Hope, Eddy Howard, H. V. Kaltenborn, Kay Kyser, Art Linkletter, Robert Merrill, Frank Sinatra and Red Skelton, as well as the stars of Amos 'n' Andy, A Date with Judy, Dr. I.Q., The Great Gildersleeve, Mr. District Attorney, The Phil Harris-Alice Faye Show, Truth or Consequences and Quiz Kids.

== Books ==
His advertising art included a unique approach of caricaturing ordinary people, as seen in his Pitney-Bowes Postage Meter advertisement which ran in The Saturday Evening Post in 1955. His children's books include Pixie Pete's Christmas Party (1937), Miriam Schlein's Shapes (Scott Foresman, 1952), Dinosaur Joke Book (Grosset & Dunlap, 1969) and Sullivan Bites News: Perverse News Items by Frank Sullivan (Little, Brown, 1954).

As head of his own map-making firm, he created an unusual relief map, the six-foot Geo-Physical Globe. Berman lived in Chappaqua, New York, and later lived in Spain.

== Death ==
Berman died in 1995 in New York City, two weeks after his 88th birthday.

== See also ==
- List of caricaturists
