= Emilio Roig de Leuchsenring =

Cuban journalist and historian (1889–1964)

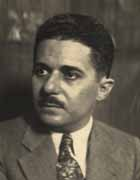

1st Chief Historian of the City of Havana
- In office 1964 until his death

Personal details
- Born: August 23, 1889; Havana
- Died: August 8, 1964; Havana
- Nickname(s): Roig; English: "Red"

Emilio Roig de Leuchsenring was a prominent Cuban journalist whose work occupied the first half of the twentieth century, prior to the Cuban Revolution. He was also a historian, who has published over one hundred books on history. He created the Office of the Historian of Havana, and managed the Havana History Notebooks. He was also the director of Carteles for a time. Because he was born and died in the month of August, Cubans have given him the slogan: "Agosto le pertenece a él." ("August belongs to him.")

== Early life ==
Roig was born in August 1889 at 40 Acosta Street, Havana, into a culturally rich family environment. His maternal lineage was German—his grandfather, Germán de Leuchsenring, served as Honorary Consul-General in Havana and owned a prominent pharmacy on Obispo Street. His father’s Catalan heritage contributed the surname "Roig," meaning "red" in Catalan. This name would later take on political significance, as Roig, though unaffiliated with the Communist Party, was perceived by some as a left-leaning intellectual and was labeled “red” during his public life.

His formative years coincided with the turbulent period of the United States occupation of Cuba following the Spanish-American War. Roig would later describe this epoch as part of José Martí’s emancipatory revolution—an unfinished project for Cuban sovereignty. These early years helped to shape his deeply patriotic and anti-imperialist worldview.

== Education, influences, and early career ==
Roig initially pursued legal studies but found his true vocation in journalism, history, and civic advocacy. He contributed to prominent Cuban publications such as Carteles and Fígaro and became an active figure in Havana’s intellectual circles. He was closely associated with revolutionary thinkers such as Julio Antonio Mella and Rubén Martínez Villena, and maintained friendships with notable intellectuals including Juan Marinello and Pablo de la Torriente Brau. These relationships introduced him to radical critiques of imperialism and deepened his commitment to Martí’s vision of a sovereign Cuba.

Roig was especially influenced by gatherings at El Naranjal café and at law offices run by intellectuals like José Antolín del Cueto and Fernando Ortiz. These venues nurtured the Minorista Group, of which Roig was a founding member. The group promoted anti-imperialist and reformist ideas and was influential in shaping progressive cultural discourse in Republican Cuba.

== Official Historian of Havana and cultural preservation ==
In 1935, Roig was appointed the first Historian of the City of Havana, a position he held until his death. He dedicated himself to historical preservation, cultural education, and national memory. Among his most notable achievements were:

- He founded the museum and secured the necessary resources for its establishment
- He developed a system of public lectures to promote civic and historical education
- He transformed the library into a circulating and research-oriented institution
- Roig collected important documents, including correspondence from Martí, Bolívar, and Cuban independence heroes

He launched the publication of Habana, apuntes históricos alongside the transcription and printing of the Havana Town Council Minutes from the 16th century. For this project, he invited Spanish Republican paleographer Genaro Artiles to establish a paleography school in Havana, ensuring the deciphering and publication of these foundational texts.

== Institutional legacy and monuments ==
Roig was a founder of numerous cultural and academic bodies, including the Cuban Society for Historical and International Studies and the first National Commission for Historic Sites and Monuments. He played a pivotal role in preserving architectural heritage such as:

- The 1871 student execution wall
- The Church of Paula (now a National Monument and music venue)
- The Havana Cathedral, to which he dedicated a monograph
- The monument to Carlos Manuel de Céspedes in Plaza de Armas, which replaced a statue of Ferdinand VII—whom Roig symbolically linked to colonial repression and pre-revolutionary corruption
- The city of Trinidad
- Establishment of the Universidad de Oriente in Santiago de Cuba, alongside Felipe Martínez Arango

== Intellectual and political views ==
A firm supporter of secularism and free education, Roig remained unaffiliated with any political party, though he was respected by progressives across the spectrum. His deep anti-imperialist convictions were codified in his seminal work, Historia de la Enmienda Platt, a scathing analysis of U.S. intervention in Cuban affairs.

Roig engaged in public debates with conservative media outlets like Diario de la Marina, defending the Spanish Republic and denouncing anti-Cuban sentiment. He also championed international causes such as Palestinian self-determination and Puerto Rican independence, forming a bond with Pedro Albizu Campos during the latter’s visit to Cuba in the late 1920s.

== Recognition and relationship with Freemasonry ==
Although Roig was a staunch secularist and not a Freemason himself, he was awarded the Gold Medal of Cuban Freemasonry in recognition of his defense of its historical significance and its role in Cuban independence. He openly acknowledged Masonic symbols in Cuba’s national flag and coat of arms.

== Death ==
Roig died in 1964, leaving behind a legacy of cultural stewardship and nationalist advocacy. He lived modestly on Tejadillo Street, with little personal wealth beyond his library. His successor and protégé, Eusebio Leal Spengler, carried forward his vision, stating unequivocally that without Roig’s foundational work, his own contributions would not have been possible.
