= Felipe Rivero Diaz =

Cuban exile Bay of Pigs veteran and holocaust denier

Felipe Rivero
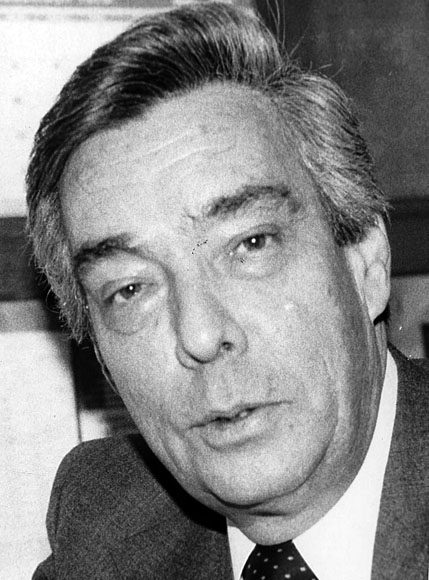
- Born: January 23, 1924
- Died: April 14, 2005 (aged 81)
- Spouse: Carmen Luisa Rivero
- Relatives: Felipe Rivero Alonso (father); Francisca Díaz Bridgeman (mother); Nicolás Rivero Alonso (uncle); Pepín Rivero Alonso (uncle); Pepinillo Rivero Hernández (cousin)
- Military career
- Units: Brigade 2506; Cuban Nationalist Association
- Conflicts: Cold War; Bay of Pigs Invasion

Felipe Rivero Diaz (January 23, 1924 – April 14, 2005) was an anti-Castro Cuban exile who fought against the regime of Fidel Castro as a member of Brigade 2506 in the landings at Playa Girón during the Bay of Pigs Invasion. Rivero soon became an ideological leader of the anti-Castro movement. Rivero was the director, and one of seven creators of the Cuban Nationalist Association (which later changed its name to the Cuban Nationalist Movement (MNC)), which was the first Cuban exile organization to use terror tactics. The MNC was responsible for several terrorist bombings throughout the Americas, including an attempted assassination of Che Guevara during an attack on the Headquarters of the United Nations, and the bombing of the Cuban embassy in Ottawa. Later in life, Rivero became a radio host at WRHC (AM), where he was known to the community of Little Havana as a Holocaust denier and Fascist.

== Early life ==
Rivero was born into the wealthy Rivero family, and while he did not possess the title of Count of Rivero, his uncle was José Ignacio Rivero, and his first cousin was José Ignacio Rivero. The Rivero family operated the Diario de la Marina, the oldest newspaper in Cuba, since the 1st Count of Rivero became its 13th director. As a result of his family's wealth, Rivero described himself as a playboy prior to the end of the Cuban Revolution in 1959.

== Life as an anti-Castro rebel ==
When Fidel Castro assumed full control of the Cuban government in 1959, the Rivero family were considered enemies of the state for publishing anti-Castro articles in Diario de la Marina.

In 1959, Rivero escaped Cuba aboard a fishing boat, and sought refuge in the United States.

In 1961, Rivero participated in the Bay of Pigs Invasion, where he was captured by Castro forces and imprisoned on the Isle of Pines with other members of Brigade 2506.

As a prisoner, Rivero was brought to the Havana Sports Palace with other members of Brigade 2506 and put on trial. This trial was covered on live television and broadcast throughout Cuba.

Rivero defiantly refuted his interrogators in front of Castro, saying:

"No, we are not mercenaries! No, we are not all ex-millionaires playboys in the pay of the Yankees! There are men of all classes and races in this brigade. We came to fight communism, period!…do you think that because I know I’m going to the firing squad I’m going to insult my brother freedom-fighters?"

Rivero was smoking a Cuban cigar at the time, and a famous press photograph of Rivero smoking the cigar while defying his interrogators was sold throughout the Cuban exile community, where he became a symbol of anti-Castro opposition.

Rivero was released after spending 19 months in Cuban prison.

After returning to the United States, Rivero created the Cuban Nationalist Association alongside Ignacio Novo. This organization carried out many bombing campaigns throughout the Americas against the government of Cuba.

In 1963, Rivero was named Vice Secretary General of the Cuban Government in Exile. Rivero traveled with Paulino Sierra Martinez to Colombia and Nicaragua "to discuss plans for a military base of operations outside the United States." On this trip, they reportedly spoke with Luis Somoza Debayle to obtain access to a training camp on the Isle of Andres. Sierra and Rivero also traveled to New York City, Chicago, Washington, D.C., and St. Louis to meet with financial backers involved with the exiled government.

On October 10, 1966, Rivero participated in a second failed invasion of Cuba. He reentered the United States five days later, notably without an immigration inspection.

In 1967, an immigration trial was held, where Rivero was ordered to be deported from the United States. Thousands of Cubans protested his detention by US authorities. Rivero went on a hunger strike.

In 1976, many historians have concluded that Rivero helped plan the assassination of Orlando Letelier alongside the security forces of Augusto Pinochet.

== Later life ==
In 1992, as a radio host for WRHC (AM), Rivero hosted David Duke during the neo-Nazi's political campaign that year. After this, many members of the Little Havana community, and others in the Miami community, realized that Rivero was a Holocaust denier. Rivero described the Holocaust as "the greatest slander", a fabrication invented to "defame and divide the German people." His reputation diminished greatly after this.

Many in the Cuban community were surprised by Rivero's fascist sympathies, but it should be noted here that Rivero's uncle, Jose Ignacio Rivero, was a Carlist who once spoke at a Nazi rally in Germany in support of Adolf Hitler.
