= José Ignacio Rivero =

Cuban exile and journalist (1920–2011)

Pepinillo Rivero
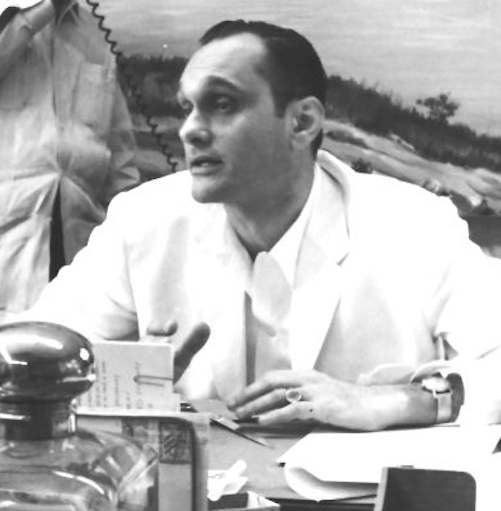
- Born: October 28, 1920; Havana, Cuba
- Died: August 3, 2011 (aged 90); Miami, Florida, US
- Education: Marquette University
- Title: Director of Diario de la Marina
- Spouse: Mariíta Mederos Beci
- Awards: Gold Medal of the Cuban Society of International Law; Hero of the Freedom of the Press Award (IAPA); Mergenthaler Award (IAPA); Cuban Heritage Award (University of Miami); Diploma of Honor Lincoln-Marti
- Honours: Grand Cross of Carlos Manuel de Cespedes; Great Cross of the Order of Isabella the Catholic; Knight of the Order of the Holy Sepulchre; Pro Ecclesia et Pontifex

José Ignacio Rivero y Hernández ("Pepinillo" Rivero) was a Cuban exile and journalist. He is the grandson of Don Nicolas Rivero, who in 1895 became the director of Diario de la Marina, then the most popular newspaper in Cuba, and the son of Pepin Rivero, who took over the newspaper upon the death of Don Nicolas in 1919. After the newspaper's public battle with Fidel Castro, Rivero was exiled from Cuba.

He is the first cousin of Felipe Rivero, the director of the Cuban Nationalist Association at the time that they were implicated in the firing of a bazooka at the United Nations headquarters in 1964.

== Career as a journalist ==
In 1943, Rivero graduated with a journalism degree from Marquette University in Milwaukee.

In 1944, with the death of Rivero's father, José Ignacio Rivero Alonso, Rivero took over the management of Diario de la Marina from Ramiro Guerra, who had temporarily assumed the management of the newspaper.

== Exile ==
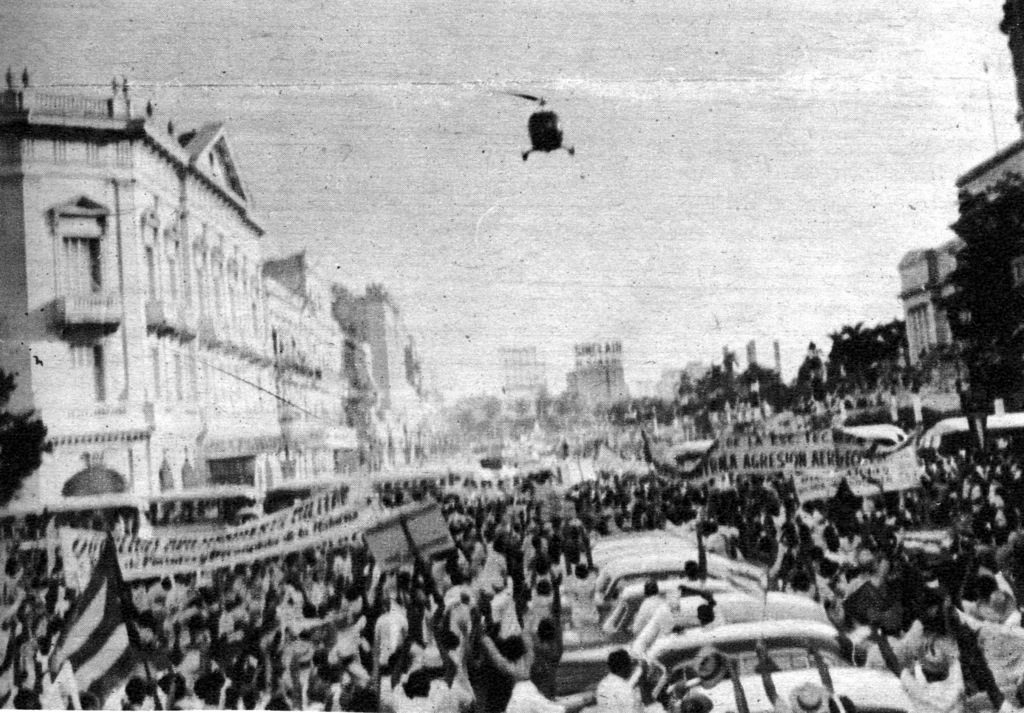
In May, 1960, a mob attacked the offices of Diario de La Marina.

After the success of the Cuban Revolution, and a series of attacks on the headquarters of Diario de la Marina, Rivero sought refuge in the Embassy of Peru.

On May 10, 1960, the offices of Diario de la Marina were infiltrated by a squad of uniformed men with rifles in their hands to prevent the journalists present from publishing an editorial in support of Rivero. The Cuban government confiscated the newspaper and nationalized all of its property.

On May 12, 1960, Raúl Castro and Rolando Cubela Secades gave a symbolic burial of the newspaper at the University of Havana. Raul Castro told the television cameras present that the government of Cuba would look for Rivero wherever he was in the world.

On May 26, 1960, Jose Ignacio Rivero left into exile towards Lima. He continued his journalistic career in Spain and the United States. Later, Rivero settled in Miami, Florida, where he wrote for the Spanish language newspaper Diario Las Américas.

A rally, in Rivero's honor, was held on November 17, 1963, by Dr. Emilio Nunez-Portuondo in preparation for a visit by John F. Kennedy to Miami. The visit, which was aimed at dialoguing with members of the Inter-American Press Association, was able to generate an audience of "approximately 6,000 to 8,000 Cubans" according to United States Secret Service estimates.

== Death and legacy ==
Rivero's memoirs, Prado y Teniente Rey and Contra Viento y Marea Memorias de un Periodista: Periodismo y Mucho Mas, 1920–2004, recount his experiences as director of the Diario de la Marina newspaper, the circumstances leading to his exile, and his ongoing activism on behalf of freedom of the press.

He died in Miami on August 3, 2011.
