= Felipe Rivero =

Felipe Rivero may refer to:

- Felipe Vázquez, Venezuelan baseball player and sex offender (born 1991)
- Felipe Rivero Diaz, Cuban exile and director of the anti-Castro terrorist group MNC
- Felipe Ribero y Lemoine, 19th century Governor of the Dominican Republic and Spanish Minister of War in 1865
