= Fernando Tarazona =

Spanish painter

- Born: October 4, 1893; Valencia, Spain
- Died: January 28, 1979 (aged 85); Madrid, Spain

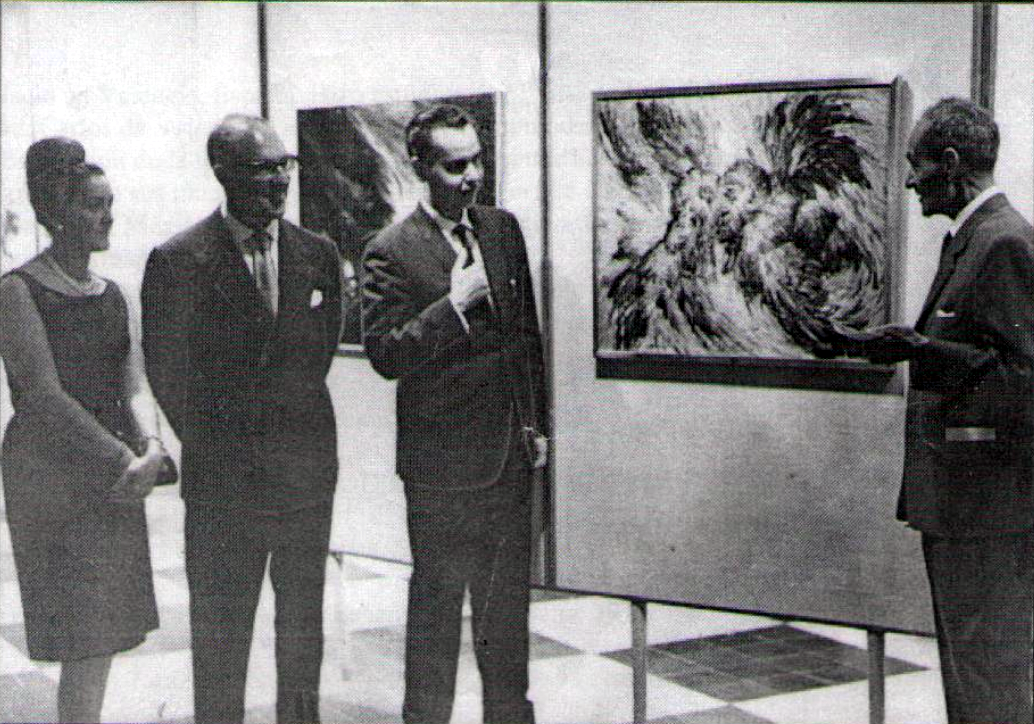
Tarazona (at right) in 1949

Fernando Tarazona was a Spanish-born painter who lived much of his life in exile, in Cuba. He was one of the first painters in the world to focus on Afro-Cubans as his principal subject matter. Many of these works depicted magical realism and spirituality. He also painted landscapes and portraits. Many Spaniards remember him today as an exiled scenographer.

Tarazona was a Spanish Republican who was exiled from Spain following the Spanish Civil War. He was good friends with his fellow Republican sculptor Manuel Madridejos Borrachero, and showed much of his art in double-exhibitions with him.

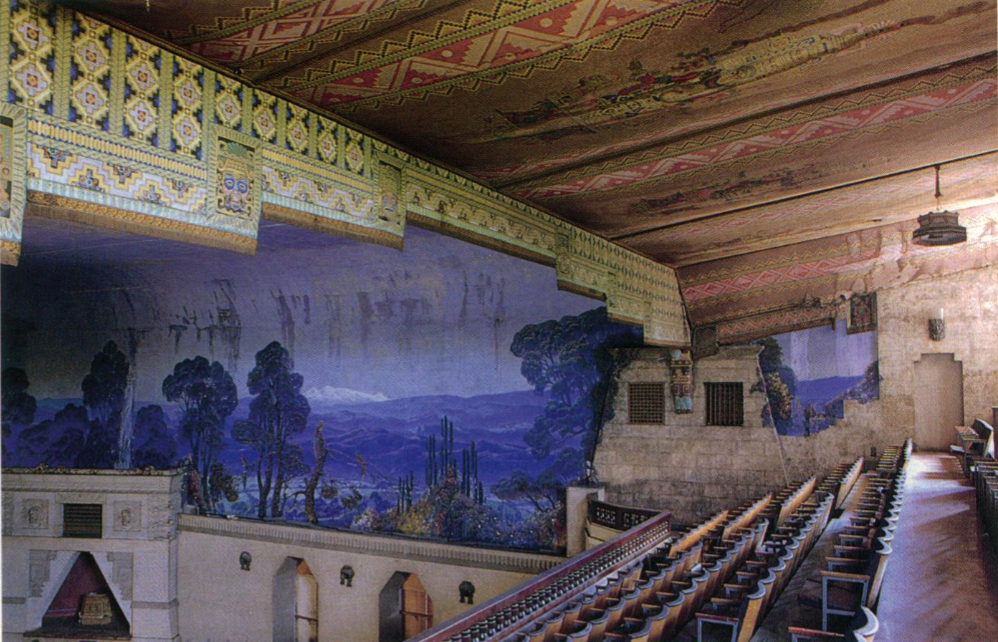
Teatro Lutgardita, 1994. The panoramic mural that wraps around the front of the theatre is by Tarazona.

In 1932, Tarazona painted the large panoramic painting in the Teatro Lutgardita (now known as the "Teatro Sierra Maestra," or "Cine Sierra Maestra"), depicting Central American landscapes. The Sierra Maestra Cinema is Cuba's only atmospheric style cinema, and after a couple of decades of disuse, was remodeled in 2007. Tarazona also collaborated in the interior design of the theatre. The theatre reopened in 2011.

Tarazona took a unique approach to portraying Afro-descendant religions and Abakuá in Cuba in his artwork, especially eroticizing the Afro-Cuban female figure. Some historians of Afro-Caribbean culture write that Tarazona's interpretation of these religions incorrectly propagated stereotypes about these religions, especially those paintings such as La Ahijada del Santo (The Saint's Protégé), from 1936, which depicts Afro-Cuban men dressed in toga-like clothing playing tribal drums in a religious ceremony, bringing a nude woman to a spiritual ejaculation and climax through prayer and song.

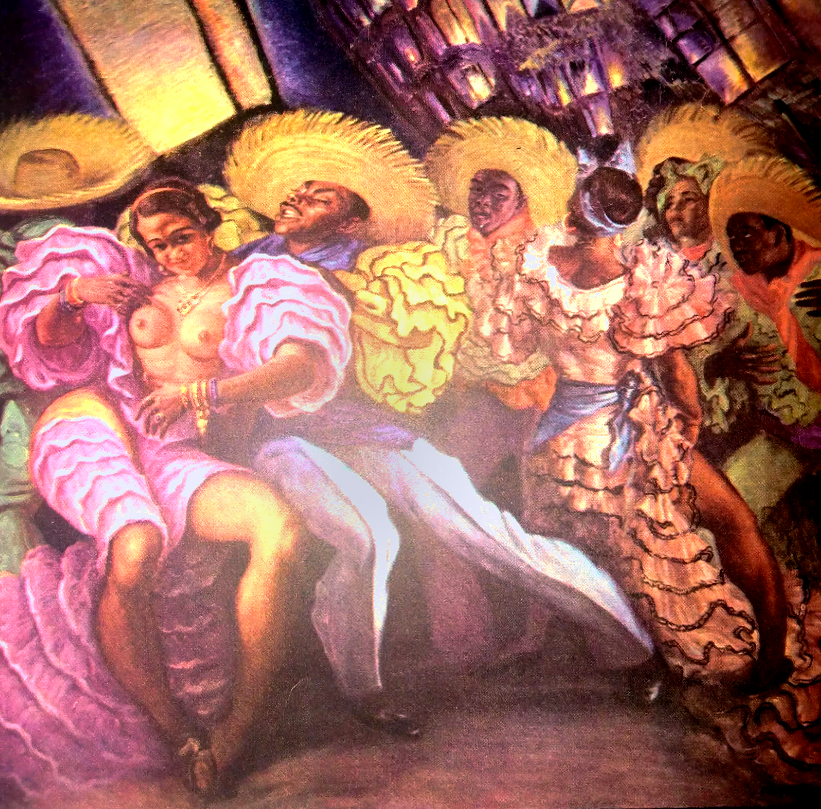
La Conga, by Tarazona.

The historian Thomas F. Anderson writes of the painting La Ahijada del Santo:

"Tarazona notes that in the background of this scene “the singers repeat the ritual phrase: ‘Senseribó, Senseribó, epé mancoó! epé mancoó!’” This observation is illustrative of the tendency among outsiders from many different disciplines — including many of the poets of Afrocubanismo — to group together unrelated Afro-Cuban rites and rituals. Indeed, the chant that Tarazona cites is in the Bríkamo language of the Abakuá, and would not have been uttered in the context that he describes."

Another painting, La Conga, from 1936, depicts an Afro-Cuban conga line at a Carnival festival. At the front of the line is a woman posed in a seductive manner, and the man behind her has his head tilted back in bliss. Thomas F. Anderson writes of La Conga: "This depiction of an Afro-Cuban conga is emblematic of the commonly held notion that these Afro-Cuban carnival processions were lewd and offensive spectacles."

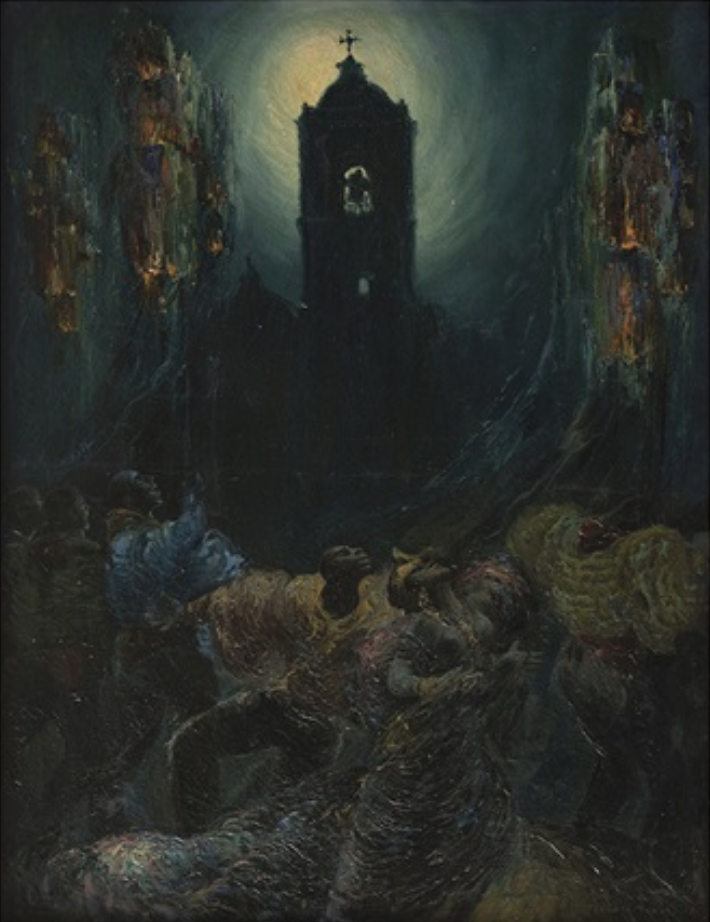
Carnaval de la Habana, by Tarazona.

Tarazona's later painting, Carnaval de la Habana, from 1951, evokes a different emotion, depicting Afro-Cubans in a reverent and contemplative prayer - a stark contrast to La Conga. This indicates to some historians an evolution in his understanding of Afro-Cuban culture.

In 1951, Tarazona was requisitioned by the family of the Count of Rivero to paint the posthumous portrait of José Ignacio Rivero Alonso that appears in the Museo de Arte Moderno in Madrid.

In October 1937, Tarazona exhibited at the Paul Reinhardt art gallery in New York City.

Many of his works are in the Museum of Guanabacoa, including El Juramento.
