= Julio Cano Lasso =

Spanish architect (1920-1996)

- Born: October 30, 1920; Madrid
- Died: December 7, 1996 (aged 76); Madrid
- Resting place: Torrelodones
- Education: Polytechnic University of Madrid
- Movement: Rationalist
- Spouse: María del Pilar Pintos Vázquez-Quirós
- Children: Lucia Cano; Diego Cano Pintos; Gonzalo Cano Pintos; Alfonso Cano Pintos
- Awards: Antonio Camuñas Prize for Architecture; Gold Medal in Spanish Architecture Award; National Architecture Award of Spain

Julio Cano Lasso was a Spanish architect, considered a master of Spanish architecture, alongside his contemporaries in the Madrid Rationalist school. He began his architectural studies in 1939, following the Spanish Civil War, and completed his studies in 1949. In the 1960s, he was architectural advisor to the General Directorate of Urban Planning. In 1987, he won the Antonio Camuñas Prize for Architecture. Beginning in 1990, he was a member of the Royal Academy of Fine Arts of San Fernando. In 1991, he earned the "Gold Medal in Spanish Architecture Award" from the Consejo Superior de los Colegios de Arquitectos de España. Cano Lasso said that he was influenced largely by Willem Marinus Dudok and Frank Lloyd Wright.

Today, his children Lucia Cano Pintos, Diego Cano Pintos, Gonzalo Cano Pintos and Alfonso Cano Pintos, are all architects. Lucia is the most prominent of the children, having won awards for architecture, and owns the architectural firm SelgasCano with her husband Jose Selgas. Diego, Gonzalo, and Alfonso manage the firm Studio CanoLasso.

The architectural historian Antón Capitel writes of Cano:

"Cano, apparently a true eclectic, mixed almost from the beginning the rationalist and organic attitudes, either because he used them at the same time or because he combined them in the same work, thus approaching almost all his colleagues, even the erratic trajectory of Oiza, without resembling any of them. Without the enlightened metaphysical attitude of Sota or Cabrero, without the obsessive analytical condition or the late-youthful attitude of Oiza, or without the passionate plasticity of a Fernández Alba, or a Higueras, Cano belongs to an attitude of a much more moderate character, moderation armed with a powerful plastic sensitivity, as well as with the force of a professional skill and good sense capable of weighing and measuring the appropriateness of the subject and the place, and choosing, or mixing, accordingly, his resources. In this sense he was more modern than the others, if you will pardon the paradox —in the sense of being more contemporary now, advancing then what was later to happen— which explains his lack of real prominence in the first decades and, as I said, his stronger rise in the last decades."

On the Centenary of Cano's birth, the Madrid Institute of Architects and the Ministry of Transport, Mobility, and Urban Agenda published "Julio Cano Lasso. Naturalezas," a collection of photographs and biographical information about Cano.

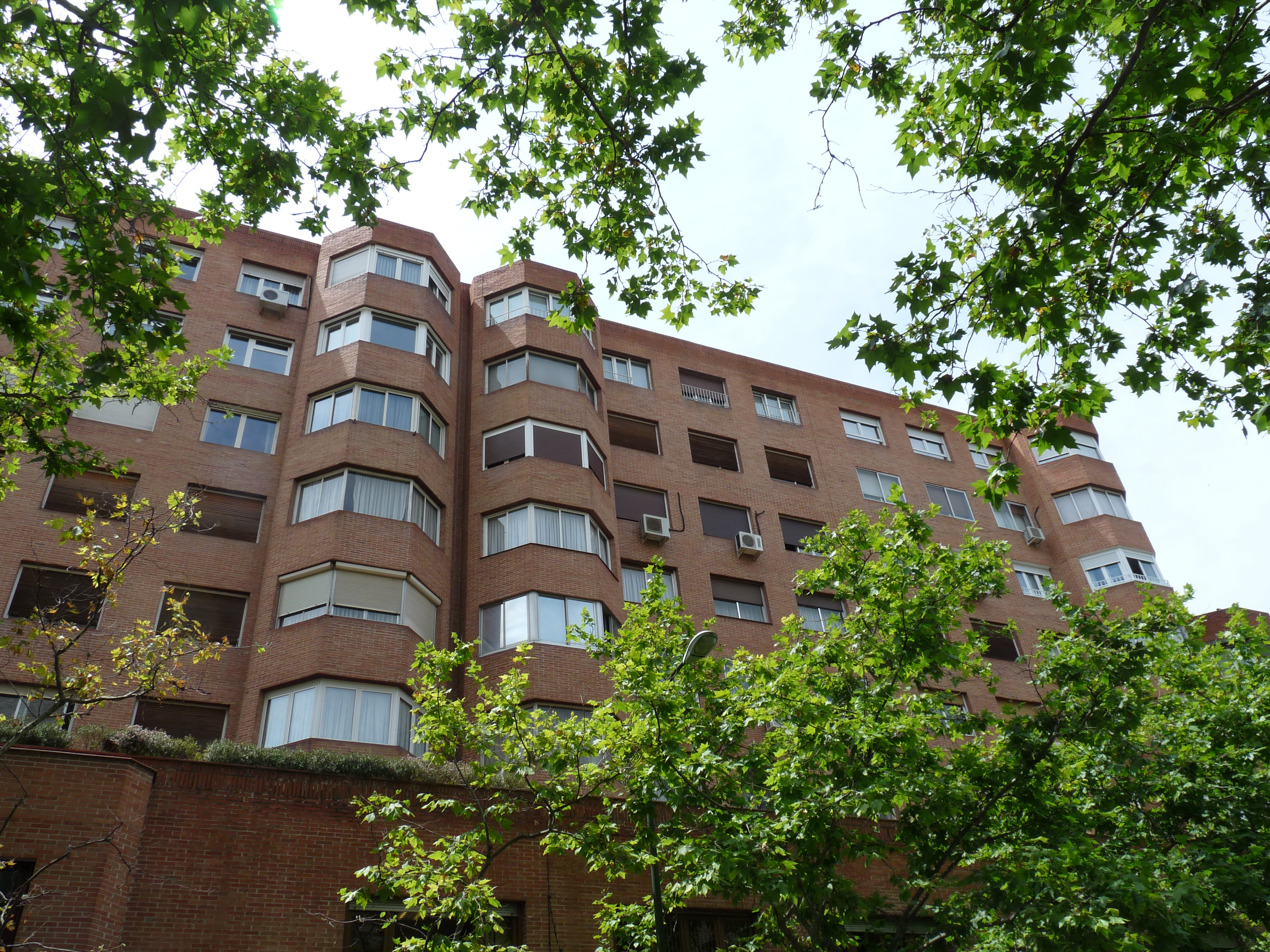
Block of flats on Basílica Street

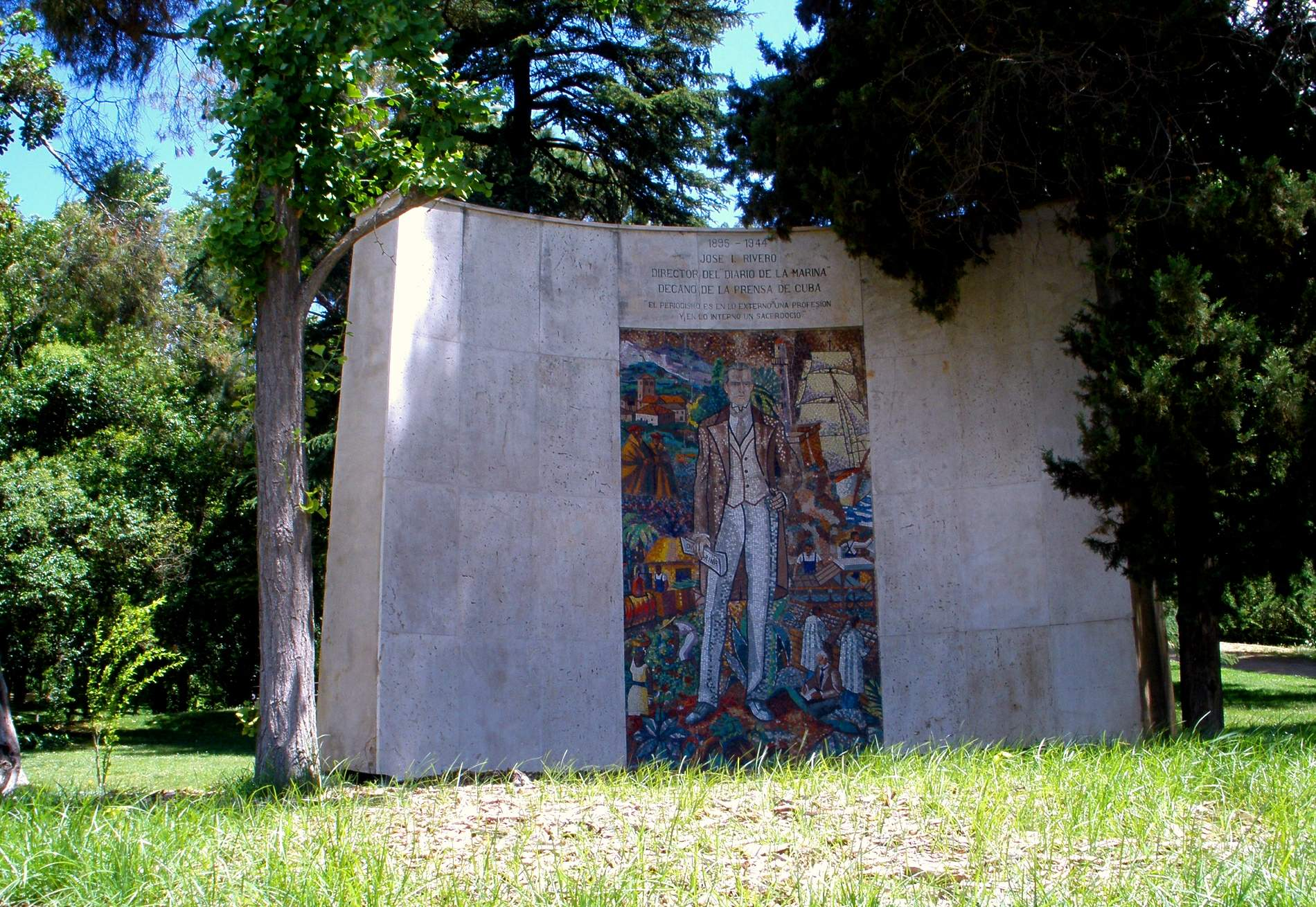
Monument to Pepín Rivero, designed by Julio Cano Lasso, at Parque del Oeste

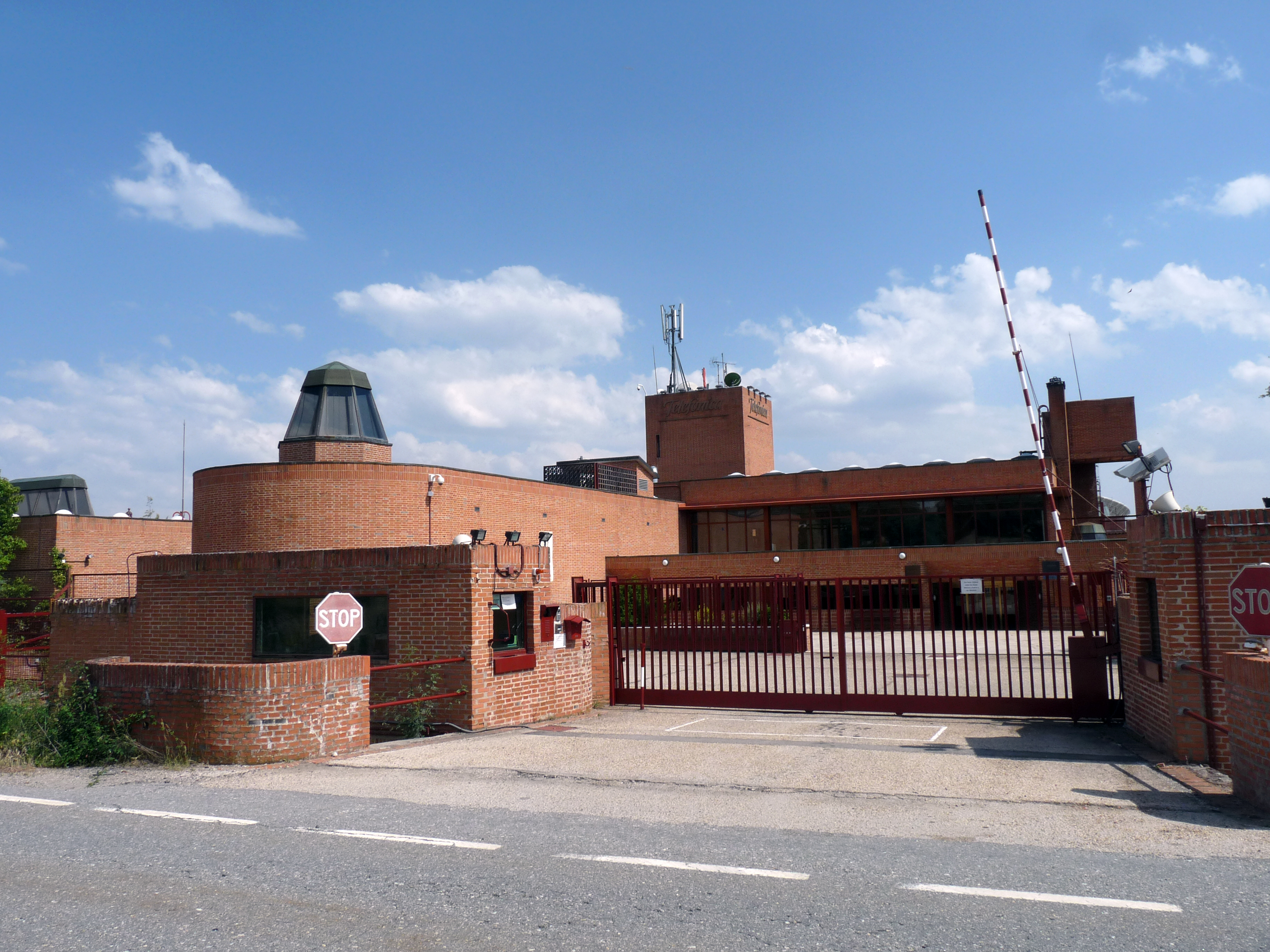
Buitrago del Lozoya satellite communications station.

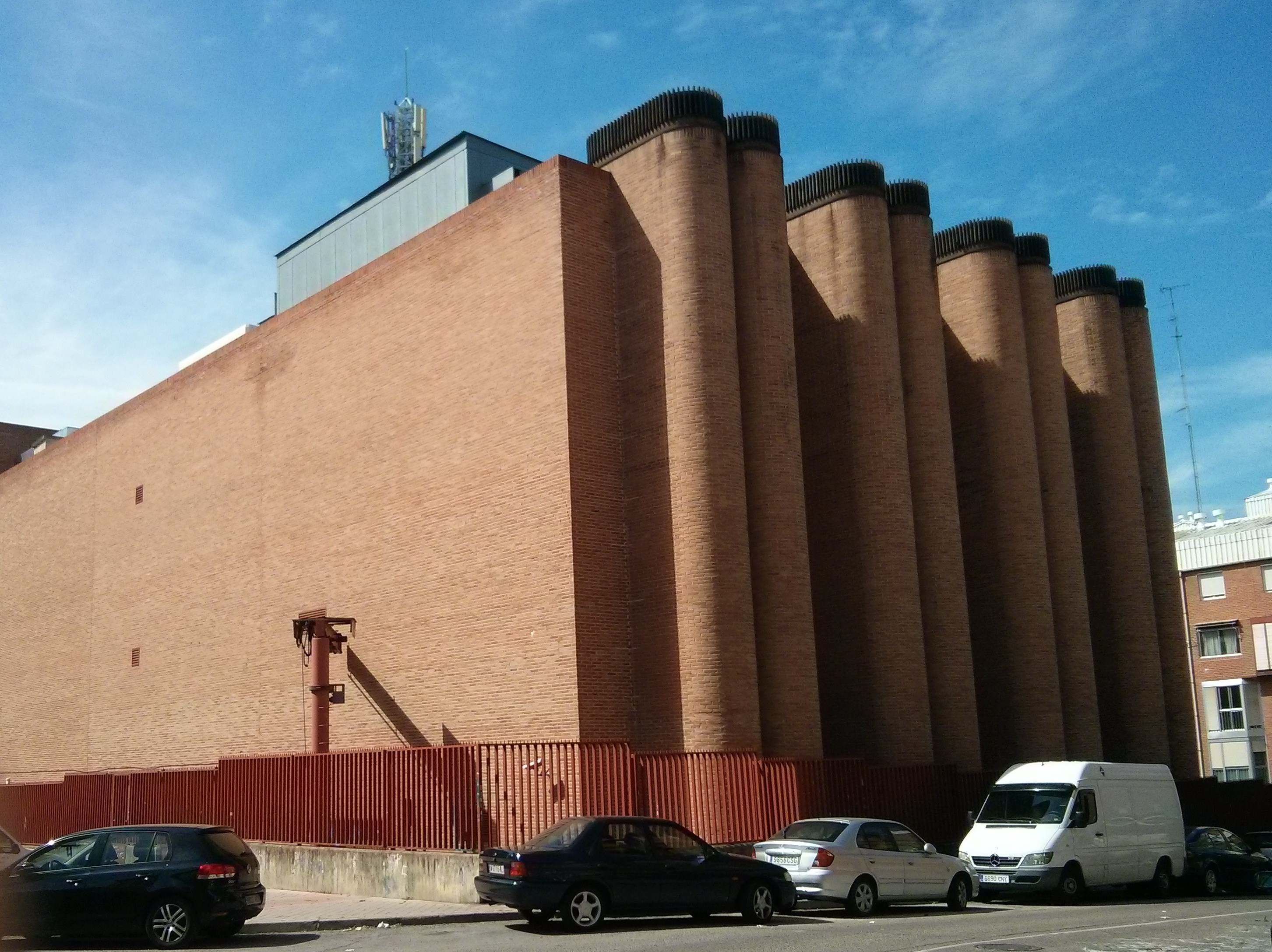
Telephone Exchange in La Concepción.

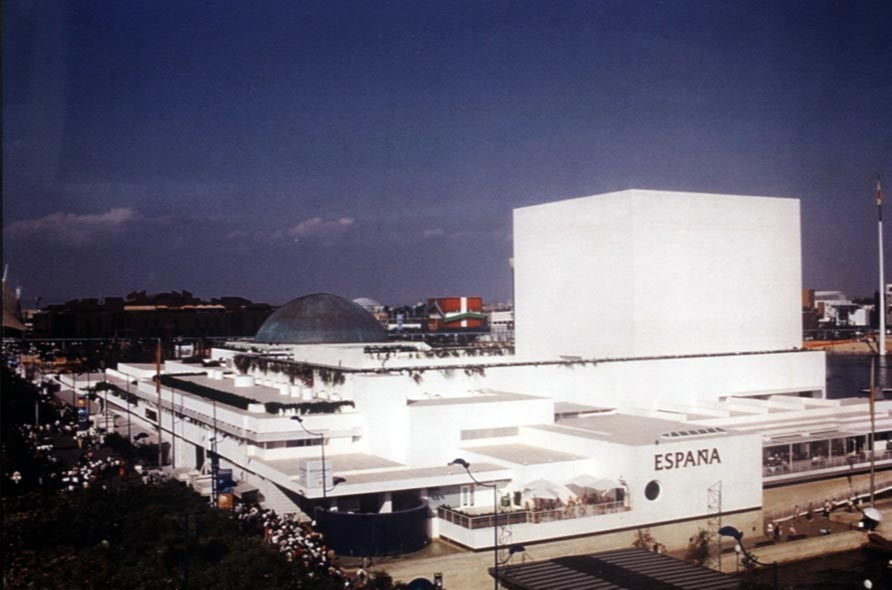
Spanish Pavilion, Seville World's Fair.

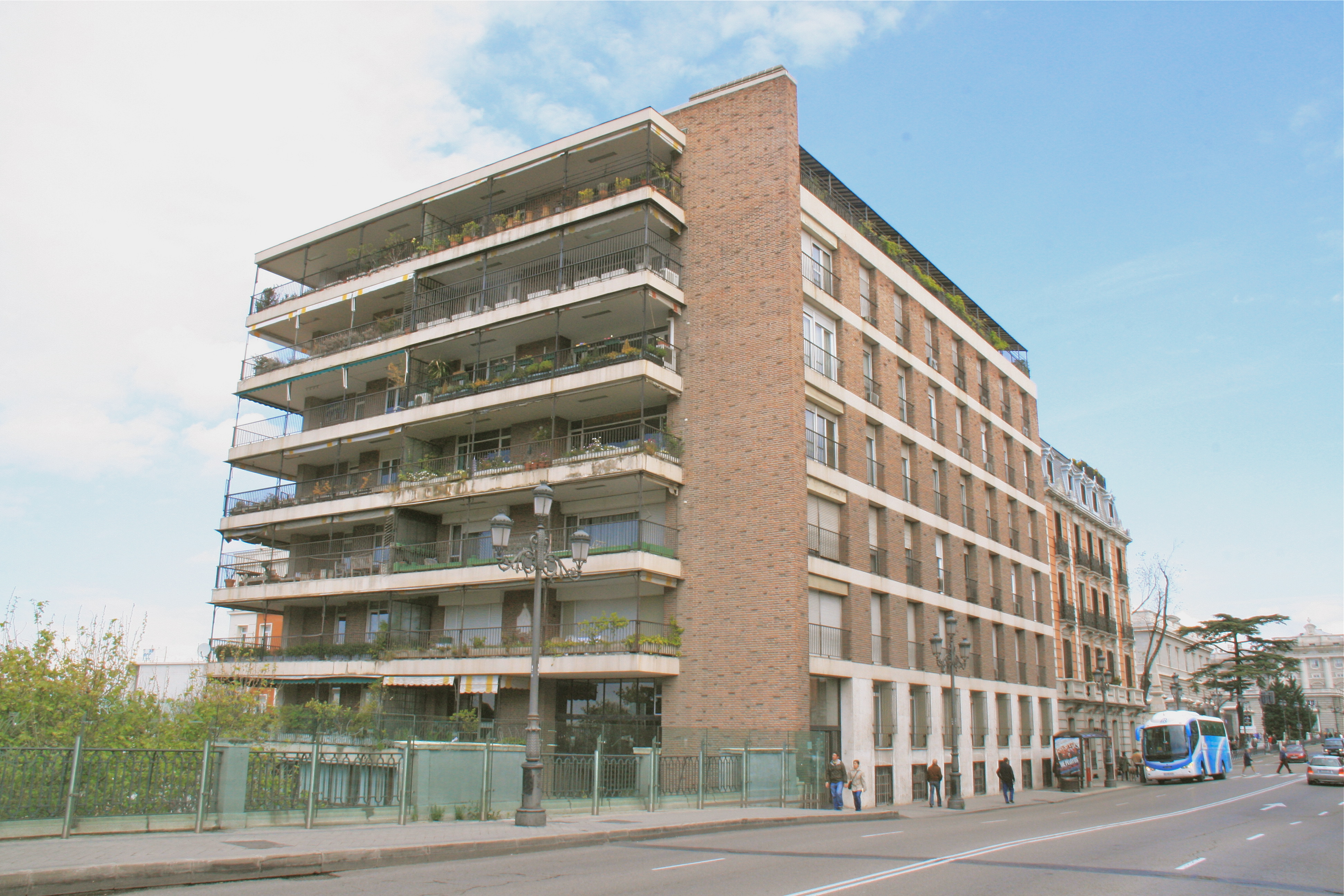
Houses next to the viaduct (Madrid) - Bailén street - Architects: Fernandez Moreno Barberá, Julio Cano Lasso, - Built between 1958 and 1960.

== Projects ==
- One of Cano's first projects was the posthumous monument to José Ignacio Rivero Alonso, the famous Spanish-Cuban newspaper owner, at the Parque del Oeste.
- San Pol Theatre and Church of St. Pius X, 1955-1963, Madrid (With Alfonso Quereizaeta Enríquez, Fernando Moreno Barberá, José María Rodríguez Cano, Juan Gómez González de la Buelga, Juan Piqueras Menéndez, Manuel Ambrós Escanellas, Rafael de la Joya Castro, and Vicente Benlloch)
- San Antonio neighborhood or the mountain barracks, 1955-1965, Madrid
- Cinema on Navarra Avenue, 1956, Soria
- Royal Cinema House, 1957, Soria
- Gran San Blas Development, Sector G, 1958-1962, Madrid (With Luis Gutiérrez Soto and Ramón Vázquez Molezún)
- Residential building on Bailén street, 1958-1960, Madrid (With Fernando Moreno Barberá, Juan Gómez González de la Buelga, and Rafael de la Joya Castro)
- Houses next to the Segovia Viaduct,1958-1962, Madrid
- Residential building and painter's studio for Álvarez de Sotomayor, 1958-1961, Madrid (With Juan Gómez González de la Buelga)
- Vite Polygon, 1960, Santiago de Compostela
- Casa Lorente, 1963-1964, Pozuelo de Alarcón
- Julio Cano Lasso's personal home and studio, 1964-1969, Madrid
- Housing and Provincial Delegation of the MOPU, 1966-1971, Madrid
- Single-family home "El Búnker," 1968, Torrelodones
- Housing for Príncipe Real Estate, 1969-1977 Madrid
- Telefónica Company buildings:
  - Satellite Communications Center in Buitrago del Lozoya, 1967-1968 (With José Antonio Ridruejo)
  - Concepción, 1969-1974
  - Bellas Vistas
  - Torrejón de Ardoz, 1970-1971
- Industrial Banking Union, 1970
- The Auditorio de Galicia
- Remodeling of the Hostal Reyes Católicos, Santiago de Compostela
- Social housing in Badajoz
- Block of flats on Basílica Street, in Madrid
- Faculty of Pharmacy at the University of Salamanca
- Labour University: (Main article: Labour University)
  - Labour University of Almería, 1975 (With Alberto Campo Baeza, Antonio Mas-Guindal, and Miguel Martín Escanciano)
  - Labour University of Albacete, 1973-1975
  - Labour University of Lardero, 1973 - 1974 (With Ramón Campomanes)
  - Labour University of Ourense, 1974-1976
- Vocational and social training center, 1972-1973, Vitoria-Gasteiz (With Alberto Campo Baeza)
- Insurance Compensation Consortium, Spanish Radio and Television Centre, 1973, Pozuelo de Alarcón (With Ángel Ariño Jiménez)
- PPO Vocational Training Center, Burlada, 1974 (With Alberto Campo Baeza)
- College of Architects of Seville, 1977
- College of Architects of Malaga, 1992
- Original designer of the Spanish Pavilion for the Seville Expo '92 (dropped out due to creative differences with the organization), 1992, Seville
- "Hallenbad," (Building completed in 1999, after his death), A Coruña

== See also ==
- Architecture of Madrid
