= Isidoro Araujo de Lira =

Spanish and Cuban journalist

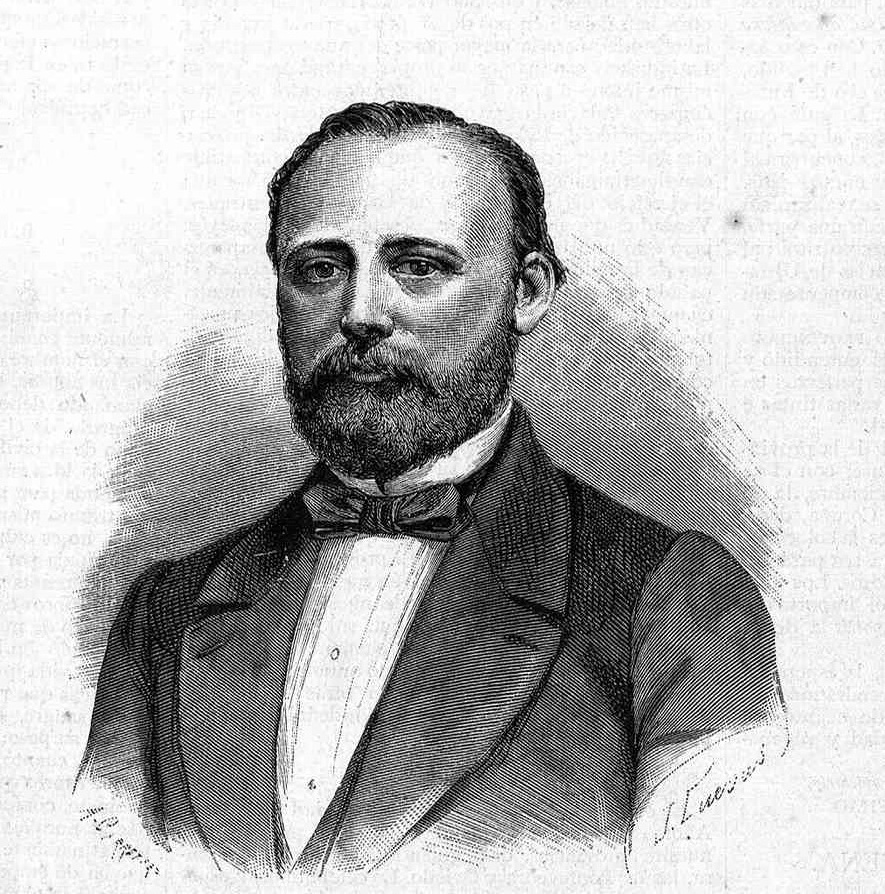

Commissioner
- In office 1848 and 1850

Founder and director of Diario de la Marina
- In office 1839 or 1844 – 1861

Personal details
- Born: January 2, 1816 Bouzas
- Died: May 7, 1861 (aged 45) Havana
- Cause of death: Pistol duel

Military service
- Allegiance: Spain
- Branch/service: Havana defense battalions
- Years of service: 1850-1851
- Battles/wars: Lopez Expedition
- Commanders: General Concha; General Roncali

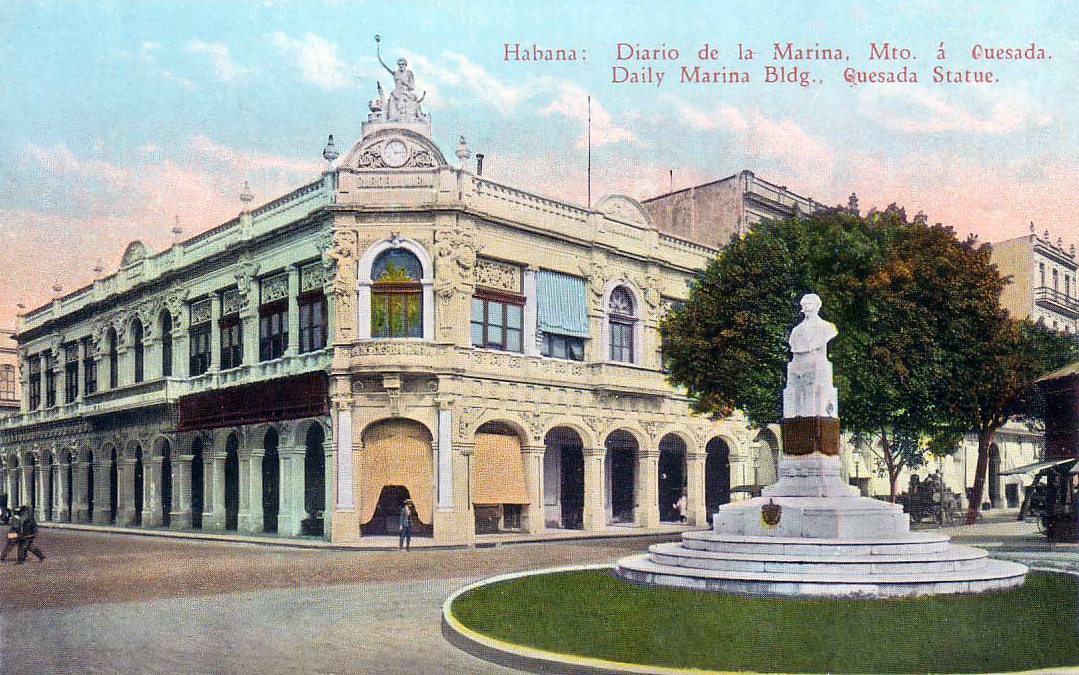
Early days of Diario de la Marina

Don Isidoro Araujo de Lira was a Spanish journalist, writer and businessman who emigrated to the colony of Spanish Cuba and created the newspaper Diario de la Marina, what would become the longest-running newspaper in Cuba until its dissolution in 1960.

His grandsons include the journalist Isidoro Bugallal and the conservative politician Gabino Bugallal, President of the Spanish Council of Ministers briefly during the Restoration period.

== Early life ==
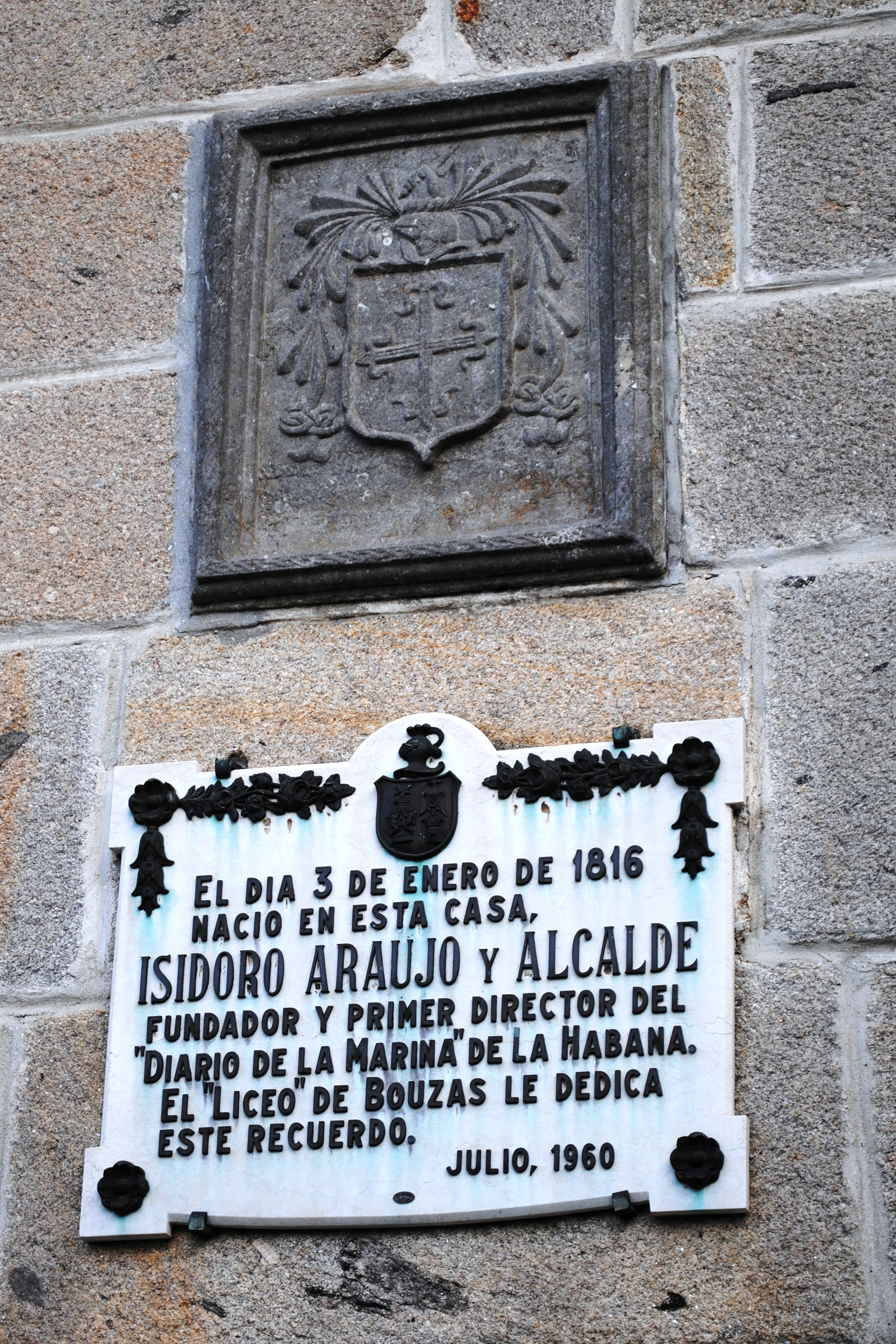
Plaque on the house where Isidoro Araujo y Alcalde was born, in Bouzas, Vigo

Isidoro Araujo de Lira was born at 10 p.m. in the Galician town of Bouzas on January 2, 1816. His father was José Araujo Troncoso y Lira, and his mother was Luisa Alcalde Mayor, both from what were called in that era "respectable families."

In 1828, at the age of 12, his parents sent him to study the Humanities in Tuy, and later sent him to study philosophy at the Benedictine monastery in Samos, until his dispossession and the initial disentailments of the Isabelline period and the closure of smaller convents.

In 1835, he relocated to Madrid to continue his education. Upon completion, he went to work in the Secretariat of State and the Government Office, (now the Ministry of the Interior). Soon after, he was assigned to the civil government in Salamanca. However, he was dismissed from this position.

== Career as a journalist ==
In 1839, he emigrated to Cuba, where he began a career as a teacher in Havana and also began to write.

There is disagreement in the primary sources and the historical community regarding the date, but in either 1839 or 1844, Araujo became the founder, first director, and co-owner of Diario de la Marina, actively advocating for Spanish business interests in Cuba. This newspaper quickly became the most prominent newspaper in Cuba. Araujo used this newspaper to defend Spanish interests against the insurrectionist ideas of Narciso López.

About this time, Araujo enlisted in the Havana defense battalions of General Roncali and General Concha in order to defend Spain from another uprising.

His debut novel, Ana Mir, was a serialized novel published between 1840 and 1841 in the conservative newspaper El Noticioso y Lucero, where he also began contributing opinion articles under the pseudonym "Lira."

In 1848 and 1854, Araujo became the Commissioner of Cuba to the Iberian Peninsula. He made several trips to Spain in their support. During one of these trips in 1854, he helped found the Diario Español in Madrid and published a pamphlet entitled "Import Duties on the Peninsula on Cuban and Puerto Rican Sugars," in 1855. He also contributed to the Faro de Vigo.

General Serano had such a high opinion of Araujo that he wanted him to be the secretary general of the Cuban civil government, but Araujo was ineligible for the position.

== Duel and death ==
On April 5, 1861, the Madrid newspaper El Contemporáneo published a lengthy letter from him, dated March 7 in Havana, addressing criticisms by Benjamín Fernández Vallín, El Contemporáneo's Havana correspondent, about his direction of the short-lived Correo de Cuba. This exchange led to a pistol duel between Vallín and Araujo on May 6, resulting in Araujo's death the next day from his injuries.
