= Nicolás Rivero Alonso =

Cuban administrator and diplomat

Count of Rivero Nicolás Rivero Alonso
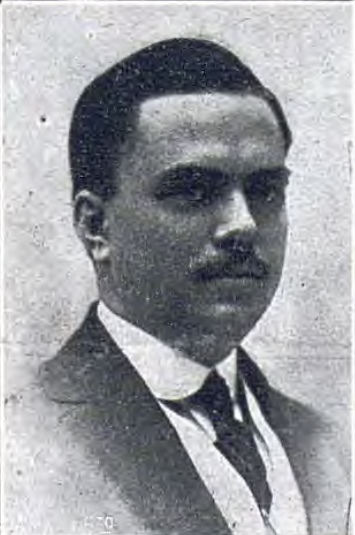

Cuban Consul to Marseille
- In office 1909

3rd Cuban Ambassador to Austria
- In office August 1936 – March 1938
- Appointed by: Miguel Mariano Gómez

1st Cuban Ambassador to the Holy See
- In office 1935–1945

Personal details
- Born: December 15, 1886 Havana
- Died: April 19, 1946 (aged 59)
- Parent: Nicolás Rivero y Muñiz
- Education: Georgetown University School of Law
- Awards: Grand Cross of the Order of Isabella; Order of the Cuban Red Cross.; Commander of the Order of Saint Gregory; Knight of the Order of Merit of Germany

Nicolás Rivero y Alonso (15 December 1886 – 19 April 1946) was a Cuban journalist and diplomat.

In 1909, he was a Cuban consul to Marseille, and one year later he became the inspector of consulates and administrator of the National Bank of Cuba. In 1919, after his father, Nicolás Rivero y Muñiz, was posthumously granted the title of the 1st Count of Rivero, he automatically became the 2nd Count of Rivero and also became the Administrator of his father's newspaper, Diario de la Marina, for a time.

In 1929, Rivero was appointed the position of Honorary Consul General of Hungary to Havana. His brother was José Ignacio Rivero Alonso ("Pepín" Rivero) who became the director of Diario de la Marina while Nicolás Rivero pursued the life of Cuban diplomacy. In 1935, Rivero became the first Cuban ambassador to the Holy See. He lived in Rome while serving in this post, at the official residence of the ambassador next to the Holy See, and also served as the 3rd Cuban ambassador to Austria.

== See also ==
- List of diplomatic missions of Cuba
- Cuba–Holy See relations
- Foreign relations of Cuba
