= Teatro Sierra Maestra =

Cuban theatre

Coordinates: 23.0002°N 82.3877°W

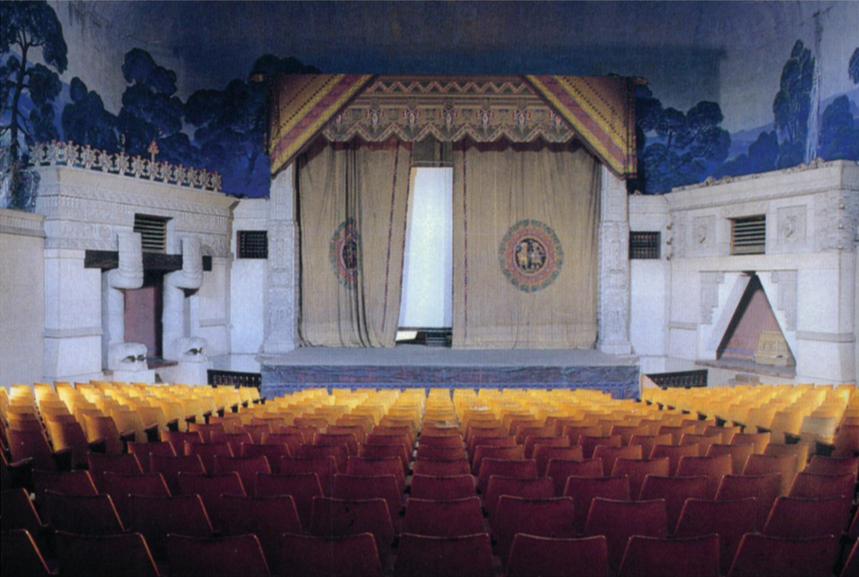
View of the stage, photograph taken 1994.

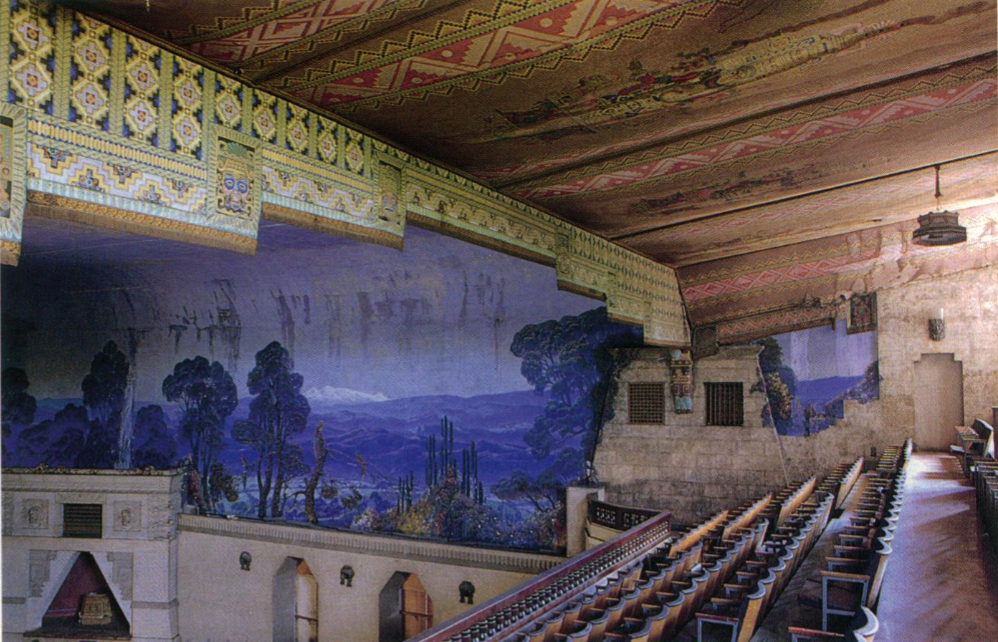
Teatro Lutgardita, 1994. The panoramic mural seen on the wall (that wraps around the front of the theatre) was painted by Fernando Tarazona.

The Teatro Sierra Maestra (formerly known as the Teatro Lutgardita), in Havana, is Cuba's only known atmospheric style theatre inspired by the Mesoamerican architecture of Latin America. The building was designed by the architects Evelio Govantes and Felix Cabarrocas, with interior design contributed by Fernando Tarazona.

Completed in 1932, the Teatro Lutgardita movie theater embodies a unique intersection of regionalism and national identity within the Art Deco movement across Cuba and Latin America. In Cuba, Art Deco was often regarded as a foreign style, adapted to suit local settings. However, the Lutgardita design represents a notable effort to align this style more closely with native American traditions. The architecture firm "Govantes y Cabarrocas," tasked with designing the theater, made a conscious choice to incorporate indigenous influences. Lacking pre-Columbian art within Cuba as a reference, they opted to use Mayan motifs. Even today, the theater's architectural presence remains, despite deterioration and modifications over time. The arcades along two facades blend with the Neocolonial style of the surrounding Lutgardita Subdivision, also designed by the same firm. Although the main entrance features some Art Deco details, it is the decorative elements on the floors, ceilings, and roofs that truly distinguish the design.

The theatre was renamed Teatro Sierra Maestra, and was in operation until the 1980s. After a couple of decades of disuse, was remodeled in 2007.

In 1932, Tarazona painted the large panoramic painting in the Teatro Lutgardita (now known as the "Teatro Sierra Maestra," or "Cine Sierra Maestra"), depicting Central American landscapes. Tarazona also collaborated in the interior design of the theatre. The theatre reopened in 2011.
