= José Ignacio Rivero Alonso =

Cuban journalist

Pepín Rivero
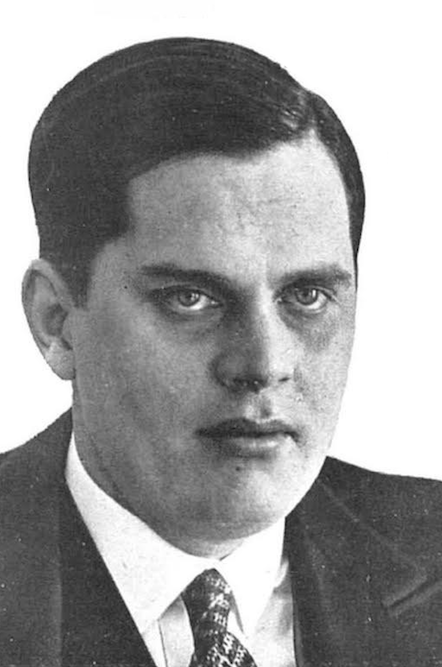
- Born: February 3, 1895; Havana
- Died: April 1, 1944 (aged 49); Havana
- Resting place: Necropolis Cristóbal Colón, next to the Capilla Central
- Monuments: Painting by Fernando Tarazona, Museo de Arte Moderno (1951); Monument at Parque del Oeste by Julio Cano Lasso (1954)
- Education: Colegio de Belén; University of Havana
- Employer: Diario de la Marina
- Term: 1919-1944
- Spouse: Silvia Hernández del Lovio
- Children: José Ignacio Rivero y Hernandez
- Father: Nicolás Rivero y Muñiz
- Relatives: Nicolás Rivero Alonso
- Awards: Maria Moors Cabot Prize (1941)
- Honours: Order of St. Gregory the Great (1921); Order of Isabella the Catholic (1925); Cross of Naval Merit (1937); Commander of the Order of the Mehdauia (1937); Order of the German Eagle (1938) [Renounced]; Order of Saints Maurice and Lazarus (1939) [Renounced]; Golden Medal of the Spanish Red Cross (1940); Official Medal commemorating the Glorious National Uprising and Victory (1940); Commander of the Order of St. Sylvester (1940); Commander of the Order of Honour and Merit of the International Red Cross (1941)

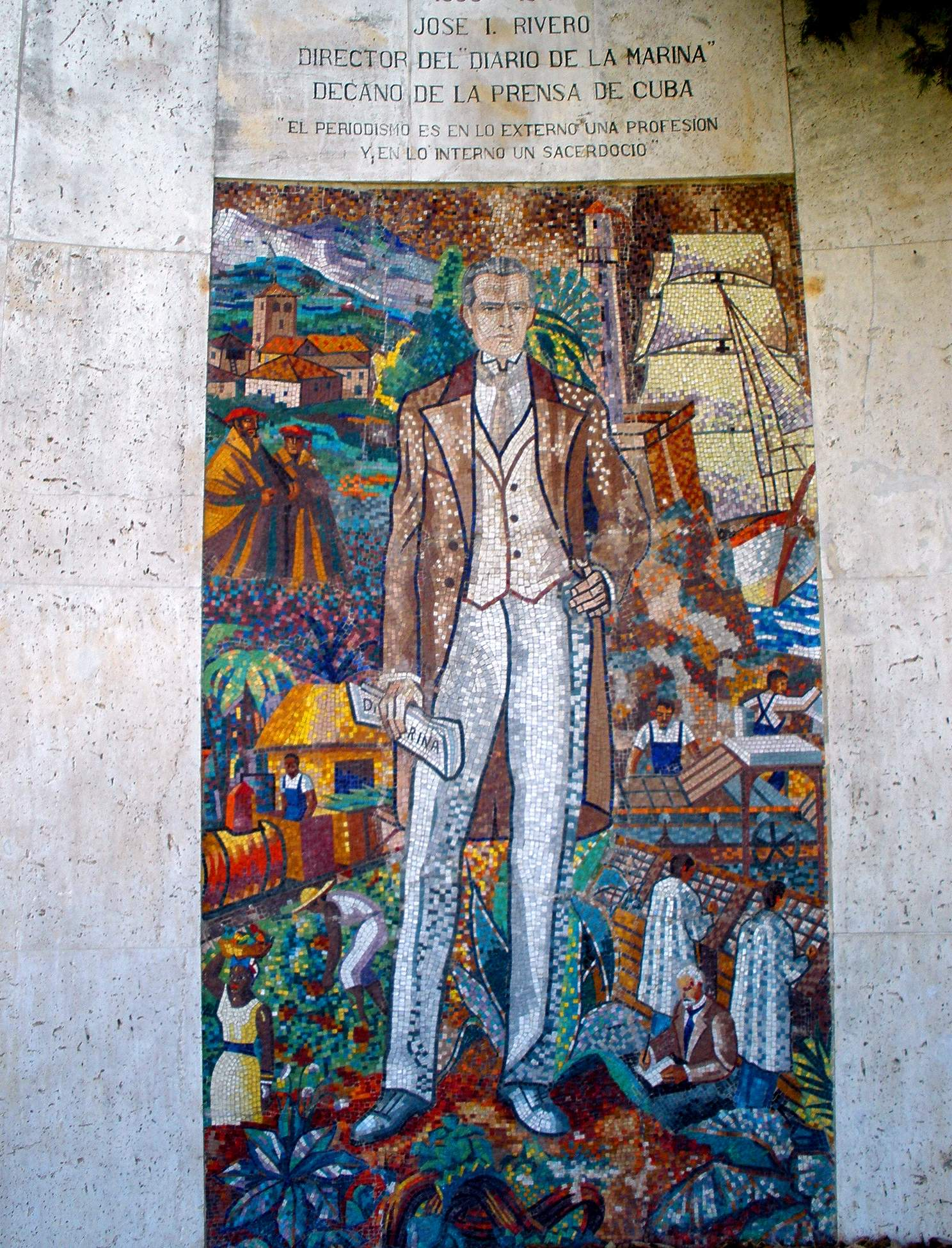
Monument to Pepín Rivero, designed by Julio Cano Lasso

Don José Ignacio "Pepín" Rivero y Alonso was a Cuban journalist and the 14th director of Diario de la Marina, which was the oldest and most popular newspaper in Cuba. He is considered to be "one of the most subtle writers of his time and one of the best writers of Spanish-American journalism in the 20th century". The journalist Gerardo Gallegos wrote upon his death that Rivero was "the most hated and, at the same time, the most beloved Cuban of his time." He took over management of Diario de la Marina from his father, the 1st Count of Rivero, Nicolás Rivero y Muñiz. He also inherited from his father the unofficial title of Decano de la Prensa (Decan of the Press). His directorship of Diario de la Marina ran from 1919 until his death in 1944. His older brother, Nicolás Rivero y Alonso, became the 2nd Count of Rivero, and was the first Cuban Ambassador to the Holy See in 1935. Rivero was the first Cuban to earn the Maria Moors Cabot Prize in 1941.

Rivero was a member of the Sociedad Económica de Amigos del País, the Club de Abogados, the Unión Club, the Havana Yacht Club and the Havana Country Club.

The Cuban government largely erased the memory of Pepín Rivero when his son - José Ignacio Rivero - went into exile in the United States in 1960: they removed the plaque that marked the house where Pepín Rivero was born, they tore down his statues and monuments, and they ensured that buildings which were named after him were renamed.

== Early life ==
Pepín Rivero was born on February 3, 1895, in Havana. He studied at the Colegio de Belén, and then was accepted into the University of Havana to study Civil law. Rivero graduated from the University of Havana in 1916 with a law degree.

== Diario de la Marina ==
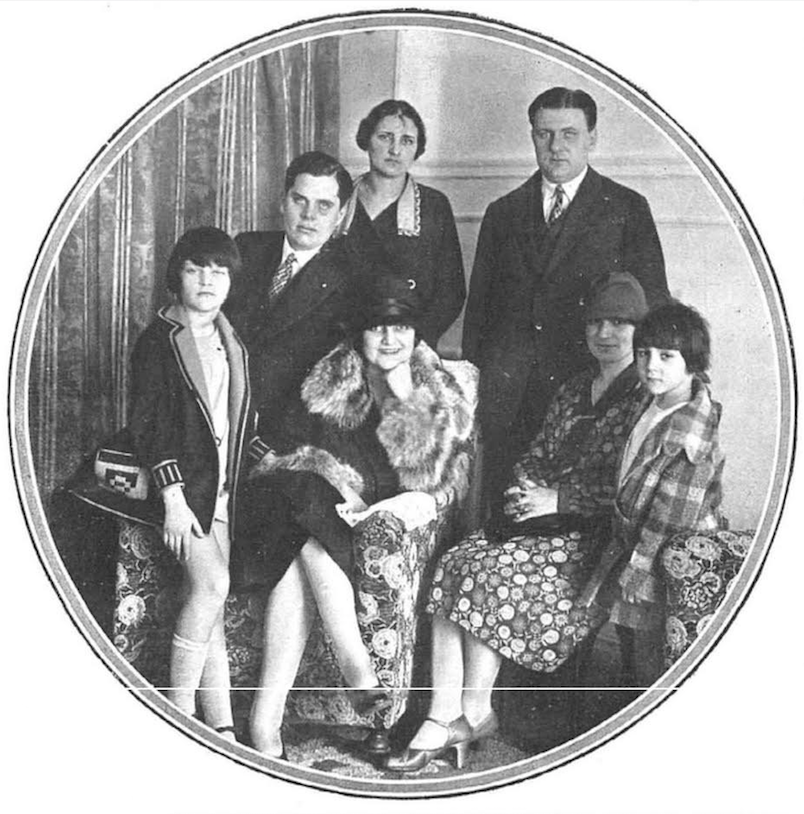
Pepín Rivero and Manuel Aznar with their families. Manuel Aznar Zubigaray was the chief of the Madrid bureau of Diario de la Marina. Rivero travelled to Spain and France frequently, and was as well known in the journalism circles of Madrid and Paris as he was in Havana.

In 1914, while studying, Rivero first gained employment at his father's newspaper, Diario de la Marina, as an assistant director.

In 1917, Rivero was promoted to vice director of Diario de la Marina.

In 1919, Rivero's father, Nicolás Rivero y Muñiz, died, and at 22 years of age Rivero inherited his father's position and became the director of the oldest and most popular newspaper in Cuba.

The contemporary scholar Gerardo Castellanos G. writes that Rivero became feared, admired, respected, and gathered a list of enemies while running this newspaper:

"Pepin Rivero is the unmistakable heir of his journalist father in the technique of the simple, synthetic, deep, fluid, caustic, biting and satirical handling of the idea with the pen.... That is why now, in this rejuvenated and evolutionary era, his words continue to be the core of the Journal; the most sought after, the most read, the most feared... Because how singular and paradoxical it is that the same people (and there are many) who hate him, also read and comment on his works daily. Thus it is that Pepín Rivero, the man they call the terrible Criollo, is not as reactionary and vicious as his army of implacable enemies suppose, but rather a cultured, skeptical, enjoyer of life, experienced connoisseur of men. He directs the powerful journalistic-commercial company called Diario de la Marina, and turns out to be the one Cuban journalist with the most substance and the greatest influence due to the depth of his pen, although, at the same time, he is the most frequently threatened."

In the 1920s, Rivero authorized the creation of the "Suplemento Literario Dominical," the literary review supplement to Diario de La Marina. In 1926, he appointed José Antonio Fernández de Castro, a member of the Minorista Group, to become the director of the literary review.

The literary review became a powerhouse of Cuban activism, revolutionary thought, and nationalism, despite Rivero's conservatism. The literary review also included a section called "Ideales de una Raza" (Ideals of a Race), which was a pro-African and pro-Afro-Cuban section, dedicated to discussion of racial identity in Cuba. According to Ángel Augier, this was the first time that any newspaper in Cuba recognized the problems of black people in Cuba, "without euphemisms and with frankness. Blacks could appear on a platform to protest their ostracism, to demand effective recognition of their civil and social rights." José Fernández brought to the newspaper the works of the following internationally esteemed writers, among many others:

- José Lezama Lima
- Alejo Carpentier
- Raúl Roa
- Enrique de la Osa
- Rafael Suárez Solis
- Gastón Baquero
- Ramiro Guerra Sánchez
- Rubén Martínez Villena
- Alfonso Hernandez Cata
- Juan Antiga
- Jorge Luis Borges
- José Carlos Mariategui
- Vladimir Mayakovsky
- Boris Pasternak
- Sergei Yesenin
- Alexander Blok

This appointment by Rivero of the prominent Minorista writer, and Rivero's acknowledgement of the Minoristas in Cuban culture, marks Rivero as a man who could give liberals their space to write and create in his newspaper despite the fact that he was a strict Catholic conservative. His father had been loyal to the crown of Spain's colonial possession of Cuba, even though he was a Carlist, and Rivero continued to mark Diaro de la Marina as the voice of Spain in Cuba, and the voice of Cuba in Spain.

In 1926, the Spanish journalist Antonio Gonzalez Linares at the newsmagazine Nuevo Mundo interviewed Rivero about his relationship with Spain, and overall Cuban-Spanish relations:

"José Ignacio Rivero smiled a little sadly as he commented: 'In this sense, we pay more attention to you than you do to us... In Cuba there are men like the philosopher Enrique José Varona, the critic Jorge Mañach, the poets Marinello, Martínez Villena, and Agustín Acosta, the historians Fernando Ortiz and Ramon Guerra, and many others whose enumeration would be long, who deserve to be known in the intellectual circles of Spain.' "

After Gerardo Machado was removed from power, Rivero created two more publications; in 1934 he created El Avance Criollo with Oscar Zayas (the nephew of Alfredo Zayas y Alfonso), and in 1935 he created Alerta with Jorge Fernández Castro.

== Spanish Civil War ==
Because Rivero had an anti-Communist stance, historical accounts of his political affiliations written after the Communist revolution of 1959 mistakenly identify Rivero as a lifelong fascist. However, prior to the beginning of the Spanish Civil War, Rivero was decidedly an Anti-fascist and wrote in his own words: "For us to feel like Hitlerists or fascists, the same thing would have to happen as for us to feel like Stalinists, that is, we would have to lose common sense."

In the Summer of 1936, when the Spanish Civil War broke out, Rivero travelled from France into Navarre, accompanied by Jacques Dugé de Bernonville, who was a member of the Action Française. Rivero proceeded to spend time in Burgos and Pamplona, and visited the barracks of the Requetés. For a speech he delivered to the Carlist troops alongside José Luis Oriol Urigüen, he put on their uniform and their Red beret, clearly indicating his position as a Carlist like his father.

He then traveled to Berlin from Spain to praise Hitler's fight against communism. Rivero was not a fascist, but as a member of an elevated Spanish noble family, and Carlist, living in Cuba, he felt that communism was worse than fascism. Furthermore, he wrote in his newspaper that Hitler had raised the German standard of living, and of the "immense popularity of Nazism and of the man who is the guide of its great spirit."

When he returned to Havana, he was named honorary president of the Comité Nacionalista Español (CNE). (The president of the CNE was Elicio Argüelles). Rivero used Diario de la Marina to mobilize Cuban support for the Nationalists in Spain. He gained the favor of the national delegate of the Falangist foreign service, and Alejandro Villanueva Plata, the Inspector of Falange. Rivero coordinated the efforts of the Falange Española de las JONS (later the Falange Española Tradicionalista y de las JONS), the Spanish Embassy to Cuba, and the CNE. He participated as a speaker in every event hosted by the Falangists and their Social Auxiliary in Cuba.

In 1937, Rivero and Eduardo Chibás pilfered each other in the Cuban press. Chibás used his column in Bohemia to attack Spanish Nationalism, which was what he called "fascist foreign nationalism," and Rivero responded by calling Chibás a "communist lackey," and a "rich, megalomaniac, extremist." During this disagreement with Chibás, Rivero published photographs of the Badajoz massacre in Diario de la Marina.

In late 1939, at the conclusion of the Spanish Civil War, Rivero delivered a speech called the "Victory Speech," where he defended his positions, and the Francoist regime.

After the war, Rivero distanced himself from the Falangist movement, and went so far from the movement that the Cuban Falangist Chief Genaro Riestra called him the "great scam of Cuba."

The historian Katia Figueredo Cabrera writes:

"At the risk of causing astonishment, it is worth noting in these few pages that Pepín Rivero was never a member of the FET y JONS, nor of the National Fascist Party nor of the Cuban Nazi Party. He always distanced himself from any active militancy that could compromise the image of his newspaper, whose institutional solidity he managed to preserve and strengthen even in the most difficult and hazardous years of the Republican period."

== World War II ==
In 1941, Rivero had dinner with George S. Messersmith and George Ogilvie-Forbes, where the two men managed to convince Rivero - following his trip to New York City - to become an ally to the United States' entry into the War. Rivero realized that his newspaper would sell more copies if he was aligned with the Allies in the war, and the Allies also needed his influence in Cuba to counter the influence of the Axis.

On July 14, 1941, Rivero gave a public speech outlining his innermost thoughts:

"I appear to be a reactionary and conservative outsider since 1933 and subsequent years when I went out to meet, like a wild beast, the deleterious forces of the Marxist revolution.
I am Cuban not because I was born in Cuba and raised and educated here, nor because I am the son of a Cuban woman. I am Cuban because my love for my country has been more than proven by my actions.
I do not care at all that I am called a fascist, because that does not mean that, given my habit of assimilating adjectives, I am going to feel like a supporter of the New Order.
I defended Franco in the exercise of my perfect right, and, by the way, long before Franco combined the Spanish State with the Spanish Falange. I defended Franco because what you are telling us now, long after the war ended, Mr. Indalecio Preto, I saw very clearly before the war: in essence, it was a battle against Marxism.
I took a picture in Pamplona dressed as a requeté because I was and still am proud to see myself for a few hours in the uniform that my father wore in the mountains of Maestrazgo sixty years ago."

On November 10, 1941, Rivero was awarded the Maria Moors Cabot Prize.

With Rivero framing his fight in Spain as an anti-Communist fight, he won favor with the United States. Furthermore, he denounced the awards that he had received from Germany and Italy during the Spanish Civil War, renouncing his German Eagle and his Order of Saints Maurice and Lazarus.

== Death ==
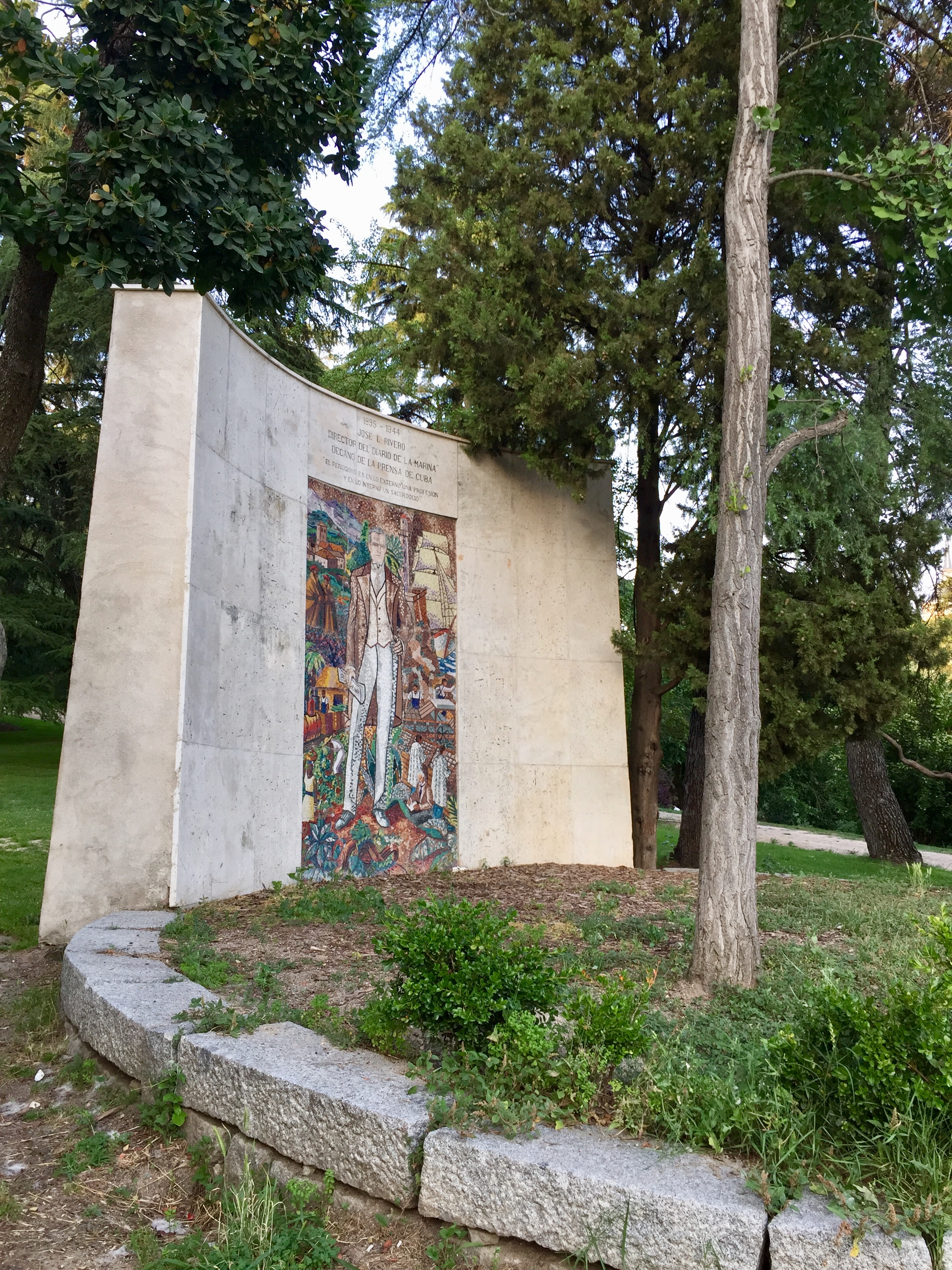
Monument to José Ignacio Rivero in Parque del Oeste (Madrid, Spain). His monument was promoted by the writer and journalist Víctor de la Serna and erected in 1954.

Rivero died in 1944.

Many monuments were erected in his honor, streets were named after him, schools and libraries were named after him, plaques were dedicated to him, and more. Those outside of Cuba survive today, but those inside Cuba were largely destroyed by the Castro regime.
