= Lucia Cano =

Spanish architect (born 1965)

Lucía Cano
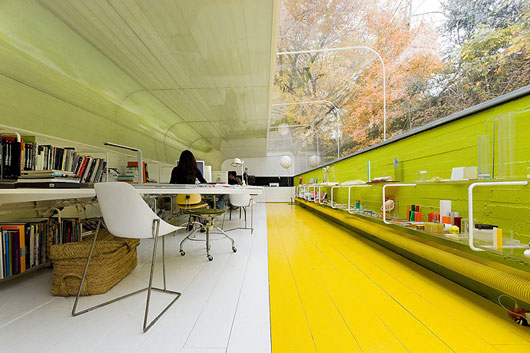
- Born: September 27, 1965 (age 61); Madrid, Spain
- Occupation: Architect
- Father: Julio Cano Lasso

Lucía Cano Pintos (born Madrid, September 27, 1965) is a Spanish architect. Cano, together with José Selgas, cofounded the Madrid studio SelgasCano, whose work is distinguished mainly by the use of polychromy, creative exploration with new materials, and an understanding of the relationship between architectural work and surrounding landscape.

== Training ==
Cano's father was the award-winning Spanish architect Julio Cano Lasso, a great source of inspiration for her, and they would collaborate on projects until his death in 1996. Cano obtained the title of Architect, with an outstanding qualification, in 1992 from the Superior Technical School of Architecture of Madrid.

== Career highlights ==
At the beginning of her career, Cano worked in the studio of her father Julio Cano Lasso (1920-1996) together with her brothers Alfonso, Diego, and Gonzalo, where she had the opportunity to participate in projects such as the Sace Laboratories Building on the university campus of Murcia (1996-1997). The family team was led by the father, who instilled an interest in painting and art in his eight children. Lucía, the youngest of the studio's four siblings, remembers that she was always very close to her father, who was continuously drawing and writing, even while resting. The children saw him enjoy his work so much that Lucía wanted such an experience for herself, eventually becoming a member of his Cano Lasso Studio until 2003.

In 1997, she began her professional relationship with José García Selgas, with whom she founded the SelgasCano studio in 1998. The studio has produced numerous works of international recognition. Their project for the Badajoz Conference Center (1999-2006) raised the prestige of the Madrid studio in its early days, while their "Office between trees" (Madrid, 2006-2007) brought the studio high-profile status, as the work was the most visited project of the ArchDaily blog. Other relevant projects created over the years include the Mérida Factory (Badajoz, 2006-2011), the Plasencia Auditorium and Conference Center (Cáceres, 2005-2013), the El Batel Auditorium and Conference Center in Cartagena (Murcia, 2004-2011), the "Casa Silicone" (Madrid, 2004-2007), the Second Home offices in London (2015), and the Louisiana Hamlet Pavilion in Copenhagen (2015-2016).

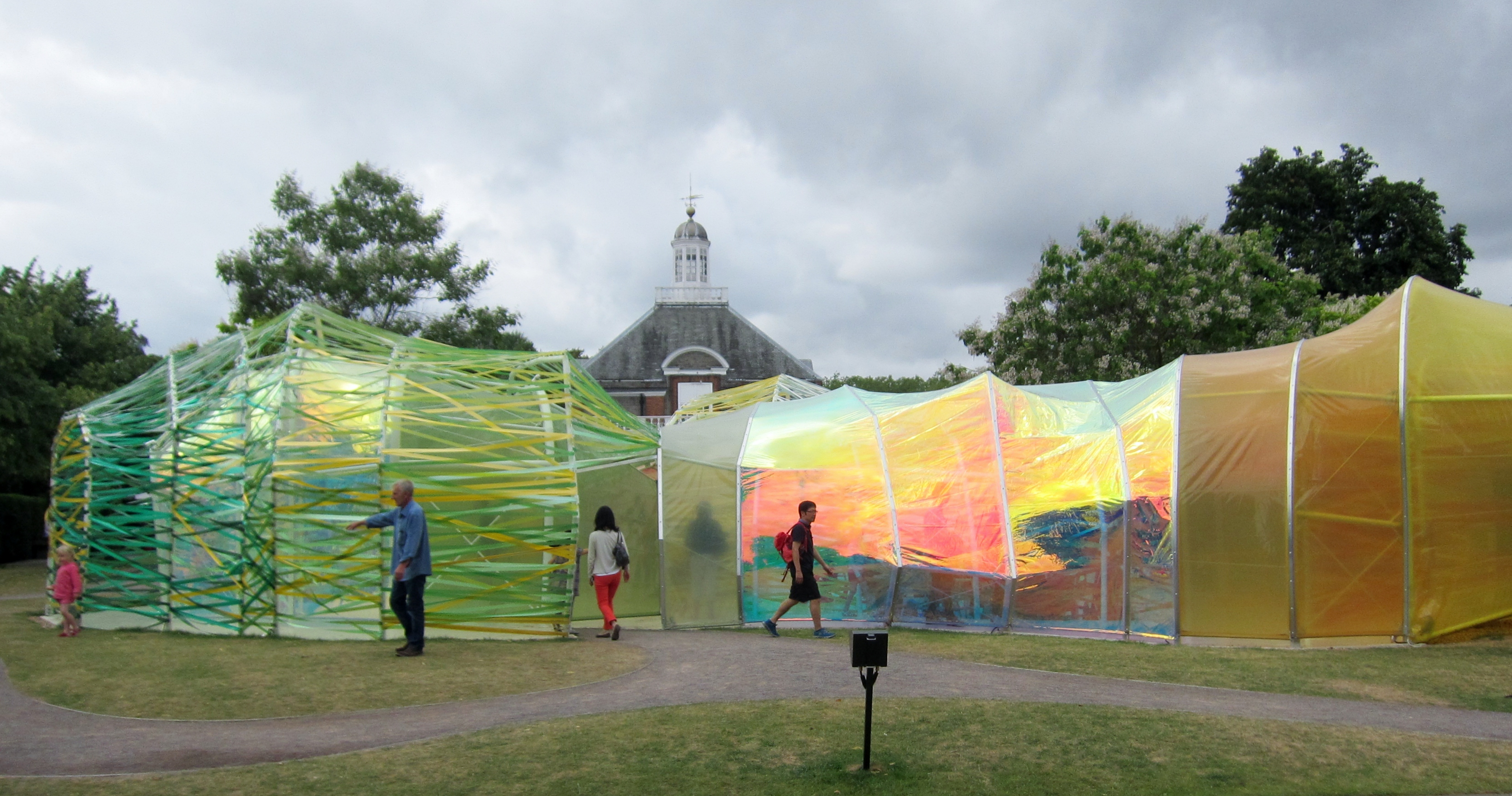
Serpentine Pavilion in London, 2015

Serpentine Gallery Pavilion

In 2012, Cano participated as part of SPAINLab in the Spanish Pavilion at the 13th Venice Architecture Biennale, and in 2015 the architects of SelgasCano designed the Serpentine Gallery in Kensington Gardens. Opening on June 23, 2015, their design took the form of an amorphous labyrinth, with various entrances and exits as well as a multicolored installation built by experimenting with the translucent and opaque possibilities of a plastic called ETFE. The gallery attracted more than 170,000 visitors who were able to interact with the pavilion. Embodying the playfulness that is characteristic of SelgasCano's works; its bright colors and organic shapes evoke a festive, childlike imagery. Yet, underneath this playfulness lies political and ecological assertions: as the materials used on the pavilion, such as methacrylate, are more sustainable and recyclable than traditional architectural materials like glass, the work suggests a new, resourceful vernacular.

=== Second Home ===
The Serpentine Gallery's style finds much in common with Selgascano's Second Home spaces. In 2014, SelgasCano began its collaboration with the British company Second Home to design co-working spaces for startup companies. Their projects have transformed existing buildings into vibrant backdrops filled with curving forms and greenery, which has become Second Home's signature architectural style. The bright palette and choice of furniture created an energetic office space for small- to medium-sized groups to work and interact. Due to the flexible nature of the spaces, SelgasCano's proposal ensures a range of activities and events can take place in shared areas for everyone. The architectural firm has designed a total of four office spaces in London, one in Lisbon, and a 90,000 square feet campus in East Hollywood.

== Design approach ==
The SelgasCano Serpentine Pavilion and Second Home spaces demonstrate Cano's sense of experimentation. In an interview with architectural professor and journalist Frank Kaltenbach, shortly after the opening of the Plasencia Congress Centre—another colorful, flexible building that bespeaks experimentation—Cano states:

We draw inspiration from many sources that lie outside architecture. After all, we are not building for architects but for the people out there, and they can often judge a building better than certain experts ... We don't even try to invent things; this is not the job of architecture. For us it is much more important that we allow ourselves the greatest possible design freedom. We like to use unconventional materials, for example, or play with colors. Often our decision for a certain material is also the result of a limited budget.

SelgasCano views architecture as a freedom of interpreting what is seen in new ways. In any project, there is always something staring at the architect—something to be sought out and understood. Still, Cano's approach to architecture is a union of experimentation with function. For Cano, aspects of art—such as freedom or open-mindedness—can be incorporated into architecture in a sense of experimentation, of "seeing how far you can go." However, the basis of architecture is to fulfill a function, and this it must do or it ultimately fails. For this reason, the best material is the cheapest, particularly vernacular materials that are simple.

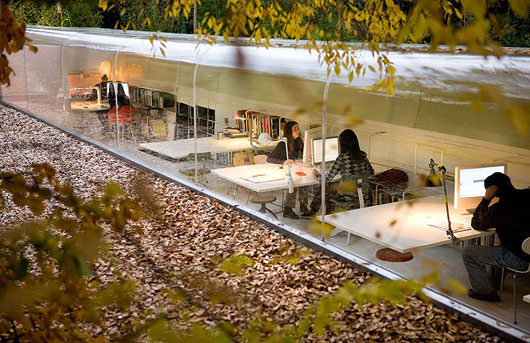
Office of Salgascano ("Office under trees"), 2007

Another key aspect of Cano's design has been a respect for and incorporation of nature. Cano has stated her architectural manifesto: "There cannot be architecture without vegetation." She also acknowledges that "the most difficult thing for architecture is how to approach or interpret nature." Cano and Selgas look for nature to protect and even take over their buildings, as with planting 1,000 palm trees within their Cartagena Auditorium and Congress Centre, and the cultivation of green slopes shown in their Badajoz Congress Centre and Auditorium. The firm's own "Office under trees" bespeaks the architects' desire to submerge themselves in nature, taking advantage of its tranquility as a creative catalyst and metronome of life. Their love of nature is intertwined with their view that good architecture can actually have very little presence. "The most interesting type of architecture is precisely the type that helps you realize that architecture isn't necessary."

== List of works ==
- Second Home holLA, Hollywood, 2019
- Second Home Holland Park, London, 2017
- Plascencia Auditorium and Conference Centre, Plascencia, 2016
- Serpentine Gallery Pavilion, London, 2015
- Second Home London Office, London, 2014
- Cartagena Auditorium and Conference Centre, Cartagena, 2011
- Second Home Hanbury Street, London, 2011
- Mérida Factory Youth Center, Mérida, 2011
- Office in the Woods, Madrid, 2007
- Badajoz Conference Centre and Auditorium, Badajoz, 2006
- Silicone House, Madrid, 2006

== Recognition ==
In her career, Cano has received international recognition, such as the Kunstpreis (Art Award) awarded in 2013 by the Berlin Academy of Arts, as well as the 2013 declaration of "Architects of the Year" by the German Design Council in Munich, prizes shared with the architect José Selgas. Her work has been featured in magazines such as Architectural Digest, Arquitectura Viva, and El Croquis, which even dedicated a monograph to her in volume number 171 with a review of her work between 2003-2013.
