= Nicolás Rivero y Muñiz =

Spanish noble, Carlist, and Cuban journalist

Count of Rivero Nicolas Rivero
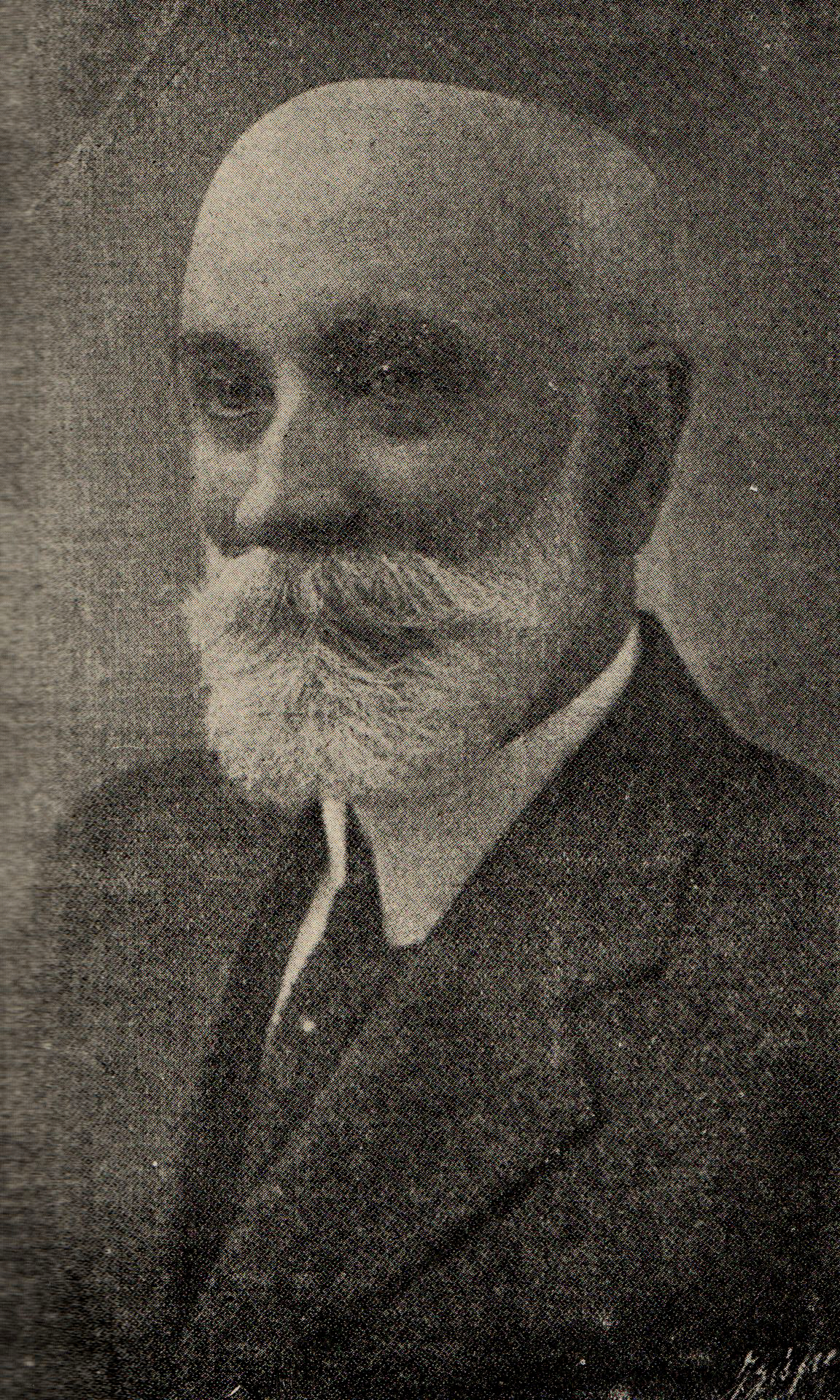

Secretary of Bauta City Council
- In office 1880–1880

Provincial Deputy of Güines
- In office 1890–1894

President of the Provincial Deputation of Cuba
- In office 1898–1899

Personal details
- Born: September 23, 1849 Las Callejas, Carda, Villaviciosa
- Died: June 3, 1919 (aged 69) Havana
- Resting place: Necropolis Cristóbal Colón, next to the Capilla Central
- Spouse: Herminia Alonso y Aguilar
- Children: Nicolás Rivero Alonso; José Ignacio Rivero Alonso
- Awards: Order of St. Gregory the Great

Military service
- Branch/service: Carlists
- Rank: Comandante
- Battles/wars: Carlist Wars; Third Carlist War; Battle of Montejurra

Count Nicolás Lino del Rivero Fernández y Muñiz Cueli was a Spanish noble, made the 1st Count of Rivero by Alfonso XIII. He was a Carlist guerrilla fighter who, after his failure in the Carlist Wars, was forcibly expelled from Spain. He did not remain away for long, sneaking back into Spain and eventually rising to the rank of Comandante and participating in the Battle of Montejurra. However, he soon returned to Cuba where he was made an editor of Diario de la Marina, the oldest newspaper in Spanish colonial America, by the newspaper's creator. He was then promoted to become the newspaper's 13th Director, and transformed it into one of the most important newspapers in the history of Cuba, obtaining the unofficial title of Decano de a Presna (Decan of the Press).

Rivero's first son, Nicolás Rivero Alonso, the 2nd Count of Rivero, became Cuba's first Ambassador to the Holy See in 1935. Rivero's second son, José Ignacio Rivero Alonso, inherited the management of Diario de la Marina and the title of Decan of the Press.

For most of his life, Rivero was only known as Don Nicolás Rivero, and was only given the title of the 1st Count of Rivero several weeks after his death, on August 13, 1919.

== Early life ==
Rivero was born in 1849 in Las Callejas, Carda, Spain. He was born into the low classes of Spain, and his parents were in the Spanish peasantry.

When he was old enough, he entered the minor Catholic Seminary in Villaviciosa, Asturias. He then studied at the Catholic Seminary in Oviedo, but did not complete his studies, abandoning the priesthood to fight in the Carlist Wars.

== Third Carlist War ==
In 1872, Rivero joined the Carlist Army in rising up against the government of Spain during the Third Carlist War. Rivero, however, was captured and sentenced to six months in prison. After his initial prison sentence, he was deported to the Canary Islands.

In 1873, Rivero was then deported from the Canaries to Cuba, which was his first time on the island. He spent several months here, but spent time planning, communicating, and regrouping with his fellow Carlists.

In 1873 or 1874, he secretly returned to Spain and rose to the rank of Comandante in the Carlist Army, and fought in several battles. One of the most famous battles that he took part in here was the Battle of Montejurra, in Montejurra.

However, Rivero's unit was defeated in battle, and Rivero was almost captured, and he fled to exile in France.

In 1876, at the conclusion of the Third Carlist War, Rivero returned to Spain.

== Early career as a civil servant and journalist ==
Upon returning to Spain in 1876, Rivero studied at the University of Oviedo for a brief time in the notary public program, but was again unable to complete his studies and did not graduate.

In 1880, Rivero returned to Cuba, where he lived and worked in the town of Bauta, Cuba. He worked for roughly a year as the Secretary of the Bauta City Council.

In 1881, Rivero created and became the Editor-in-Chief of El Relámpago (The Lightning), the Havana-based weekly newspaper. This newspaper was quickly suspended by the colonial government of Cuba after Rivero used it to attack the Captain General of Cuba. After only a few months in Cuba, Rivero was then deported back to Spain.

In 1882, Rivero returned to Cuba and created the newspaper El Rayo (The Thunderbolt). Rivero used this newspaper to denounce the idea of Cuban autonomy and again attack the colonial rulers of Cuba. For this, he was again imprisoned by the government on several occasions.

Beginning in 1883, Rivero created several other short-lived publications;

- La Centella (1883)
- El General Tacón (1884-1885)
- El Español (1886)
- El Pensamiento Español (1888)

== Career at Diario de la Marina and elected office ==
In 1890, Rivero was elected to the office of Provincial Deputy for the district of Güines.

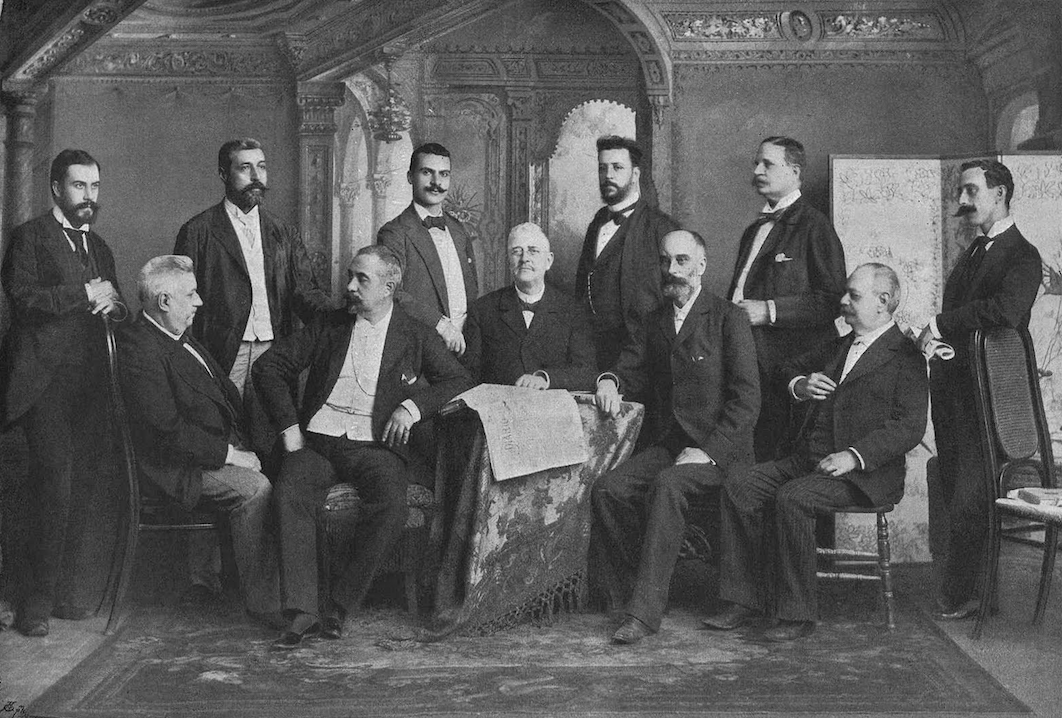
Management of Diario de la Marina in 1896. (Top Row) From left to right: Enrique Vera, José Gutiérez, Miguel Espinosa, José Pitahiga, Jacobo Domínguez, Alfredo Martin Morales.(Bottom Row) From left to right: José E. Triay, Victoriano Otero, Prudencio Rabell, Nicolás Rivero, Francisco de Armas y Céspedes.

In 1894, Rivero joined the well-established Cuban newspaper Diario de la Marina as an editor, and started the newspaper's current affairs section, and primary contributor to the editorials section "Actualidades."

Rivero was consistently oppositional to the government of Cuba, and wound up participating in many duels to defend his positions. Rivero continued to have problems with the law, and started writing from seclusion in his home at the Castillo de Morro.

In June 1895, he was promoted to the position of director of Diario de la Marina. The newspaper was suffering with low distribution as a result of the start of the Cuban War of Independence. As director of this newspaper, he dedicated much of his attention and many of his articles in fighting against the repressive and excessive government administration of Captain General Valeriano Weyler.

In January 1898, a new autonomous government was established in Cuba, and Rivero became the President of the Provincial Deputation of Cuba.

Due to his support of the new autonomous government, a mass riot of Hispanophiles attacked the offices of Diario de la Marina, targeting Rivero directly. This happened despite the fact that Rivero was himself, through his whole life, an adherent to a strict Hispanophile and conservative Catholic ideology.

At the end of the War of Independence, Rivero remained in Cuba and continued running Diario de la Marina.

In 1901, Rivero returned to Spain.

In 1902, Rivero returned to Cuba and created the Asociación de la Prensa de Cuba (Cuban Press Association).

Under Rivero's leadership Diario de la Marina eventually became the most important newspaper in Cuba, and gained the widest circulation of any publication on the island.

== Autobiographical works ==
- Veinte dias en automȯvil (Twenty Days by Automobile)
- Episodiós de mi pida (Episodes of my Prayer)
