= Guillermo and Ignacio Novo =

Guillermo and Ignacio Novo Sampol were Cuban exile brothers and militants who were involved in various attack on U.S. soil.

== Biography ==
The brothers came to the United States in 1954. Both were members of the Cuban Nationalist Movement, with Ignacio serving as the group's National Secretary General and Guillermo as the New Jersey delegate. In 1976 they were among the founders of Coordination of United Revolutionary Organizations (CORU), along with Orlando Bosch and Luis Posada Carriles. Later they joined the "Information Commission" of the Cuban American National Foundation.

=== 1960s and early 1970s ===
On 11 December 1964 a bazooka was fired at the United Nations headquarters building in New York on the day Che Guevara was set to deliver an address before the UN General Assembly. Later that month the Novo brothers and Julio Carlos Perez were all charged with the attack. The men claimed to Stanley Ross, editor of El Tiempo, that "they could have hit the United Nations headquarters but purposely didn't", instead intending to stage a protest and take away attention from the content of the address. The men bought a portable German bazooka from World War 2 for $35 in a shop. It was originally five-foot long but was sawed off to reduce it to less than three. It was positioned as a mortar and connected to a timing device. The shell landed about 200 yards short of the building in the East River, resulting in a 15-foot geyser. The brothers were later released in June 1965 because they had not been properly processed by the NYPD.

In 1967 Ignacio declared at a gathering of exiles that a bombing campaign would begin, targeting both the Cuban government and "any other nation which supports Castro". A series of bombings occurred, including at the consulates of nations like Mexico. In a radio interview he explained the purpose of the bombing campaign was to "to hurt them where they feel it the most" and claimed that the next phase of the campaign would include the execution of Cuban government officials outside of the country. He hoped that this would be "the way to start a movement within Cuba".

In 1969 Guillermo and two others were arrested in New Jersey and charged with conspiring to bomb Cuban targets in Montreal, Canada. In 1974 he was convicted and put on probation. In late 1974 he travelled to Chile and Venezuela in violation of his parole. In June 1977 prosecutors attempted to have Guillermo's probation revoked, however Novo did not attend the hearing and went on the run. Later on in 1978 he was again arrested, this time in Miami for illegal weapons possession and cocaine.

The brothers were acquainted with José Miguel Battle Sr., the head of a Cuban mafia organization known as The Corporation. An FBI intelligence report relates that a confidential informant told them that Guillermo was a "close associate" of Battle and that in the early 1970s Battle contracted Guillermo to subcontract various assassinations of individuals in the New Jersey, Miami, and New York areas. In April 1974 the anti-Castro activist José Elías de la Torriente was shot with a sniper while watching television. The FBI received information that a day before he was murdered Ignacio was caught in de la Torriente's backyard, following which he was stripped and searched at gunpoint by de la Torriente. However the murder of de la Torriente has never been officially solved and is still an open case.

=== Letelier assassination ===
On 1 August 1978 the Novos other exiles were indicted by a grand jury in relation to the murder of Orlando Letelier and Ronni Moffitt. On 14 February 1979 Ignacio was found guilty of lying about his knowledge of the murder and failing to inform the authorities. Ignacio was sentenced to eight years in prison, while Guillermo was convicted of murder and received a life sentence. In September 1980 Ignacio was released from prison pending an appeal. In October 1981 Ignacio pled guility to one count of making a false statement in October 1976 to a grand jury.

=== Castro assassination attempt in Panama ===
In 2000 Guillermo Novo, Luis Posada Carriles, Gaspar Jimenez, and Pedro Remon were arrested after attempting to assassinate Cuban president Fidel Castro during a state visit to Panama. The defendants claimed they had been in the country to aid a Cuban general who had defected. Novo received a seven year sentence.

In 2004, days before Panamanian President Mireya Moscoso left office, she pardoned all four men, stating that she wanted to prevent any future government from extraditing the four exiles. The Cuban government cut-off diplomatic ties in response, describing Moscoso as an "accomplice and protector of terrorism". The exiles were freed and immediately flown to Miami. The Bush administration denied any role in their pardoning.

== Personal life ==
They lived in Union City, New Jersey. Ignacio died in 2004.
