= Carda =

Parish in Villaviciosa, Asturias, Spain

Coordinates: 43.483333°N 5.416667°W

Carda is one of 41 parishes (administrative divisions) in Villaviciosa, a municipality within the province and autonomous community of Asturias, in northern Spain.

The parroquia is 3.51 km^{2} (1.36 sq mi) in size, with a population of 75 (INE 2005).

== Villages and hamlets ==
- Abéu de Riba
- Ayones
- Carda
- El Pinu
- La Payariega
- La Torre
- La Trocha
- Les Caleyes
- Miares
- Montotu
