= Diario de la Marina =

Defunct Cuban newspaper

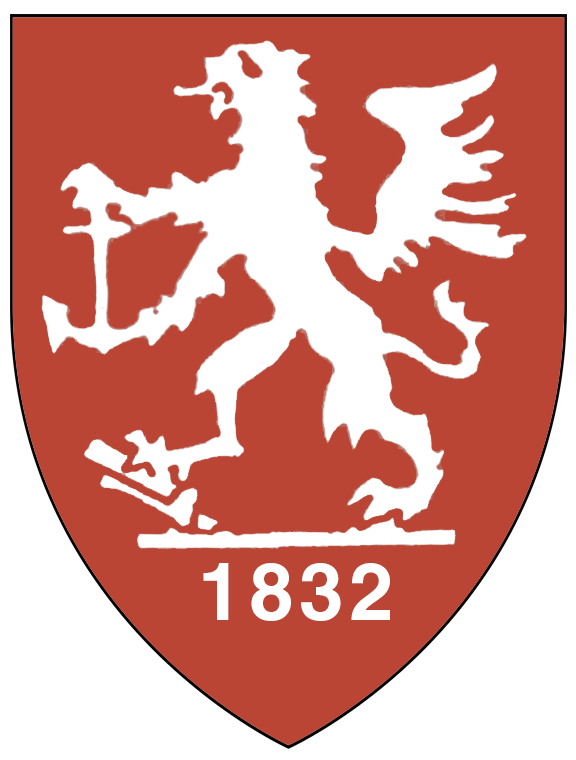
Official seal of the Diario de la Marina, 1832

Diario de la Marina was a newspaper published in Cuba, founded by Don Araujo de Lira in 1839. Diario de la Marina was Cuba’s longest-running newspaper. Its roots went back to 1813 with El Lucero de la Habana (The Havana Star) and the Noticioso Mercantil (The Mercantile Seer) whose 1832 merger established El Noticioso y Lucero de la Habana, which was renamed Diario de la Marina in 1844. In 1895, Don Nicolás Rivero took over as the 13th director of the publication and transformed it into the widest-circulated newspaper in Cuba. Though a conservative publication, its pages gave voice to a wide range of opinions, including those of avowed communists. It gave a platform to essayist Jorge Mañach and many other distinguished Cuban intellectuals.

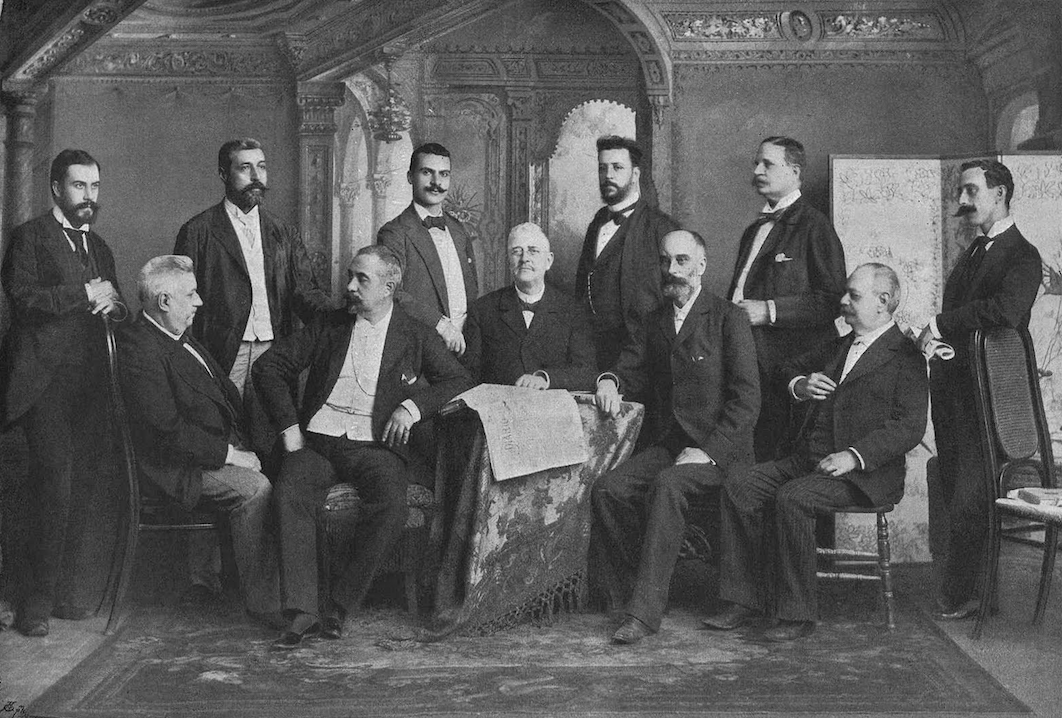
Management of Diario de la Marina in 1896. (Top Row) From left to right: Enrique Vera, José Gutiérez, Miguel Espinosa, José Pitahiga, Jacobo Domínguez, Alfredo Martin Morales.(Bottom Row) From left to right: José E. Triay, Victoriano Otero, Prudencio Rabell, Nicolás Rivero, Francisco de Armas y Céspedes.

Over its long history Diario de la Marina represented a Catholic conservative philosophy that opposed the dictatorships of Gerardo Machado in the 1930s and Fulgencio Batista in the 1950s. Its attempt to maintain that tradition of opposition under Castro included being the only newspaper that published the letters denouncing the Castro regime written by Revolutionary Commander Huber Matos from prison after his October 1959 arrest for “counter-revolutionary treason”. 1953, the Diario had a circulation of 28,000 weekdays and 35,000 on Sundays, with 36 to 48 pages, selling for five cents. Its audience was government officials and the upper and middle classes. During 1930-1933, the editorial page cartoonist was Eduardo Abela and during the 1950s it was Jose Manuel Roseñada.

The newspaper was published in exile in Miami, Florida, from 1960 until 1961, when it ceased publication.

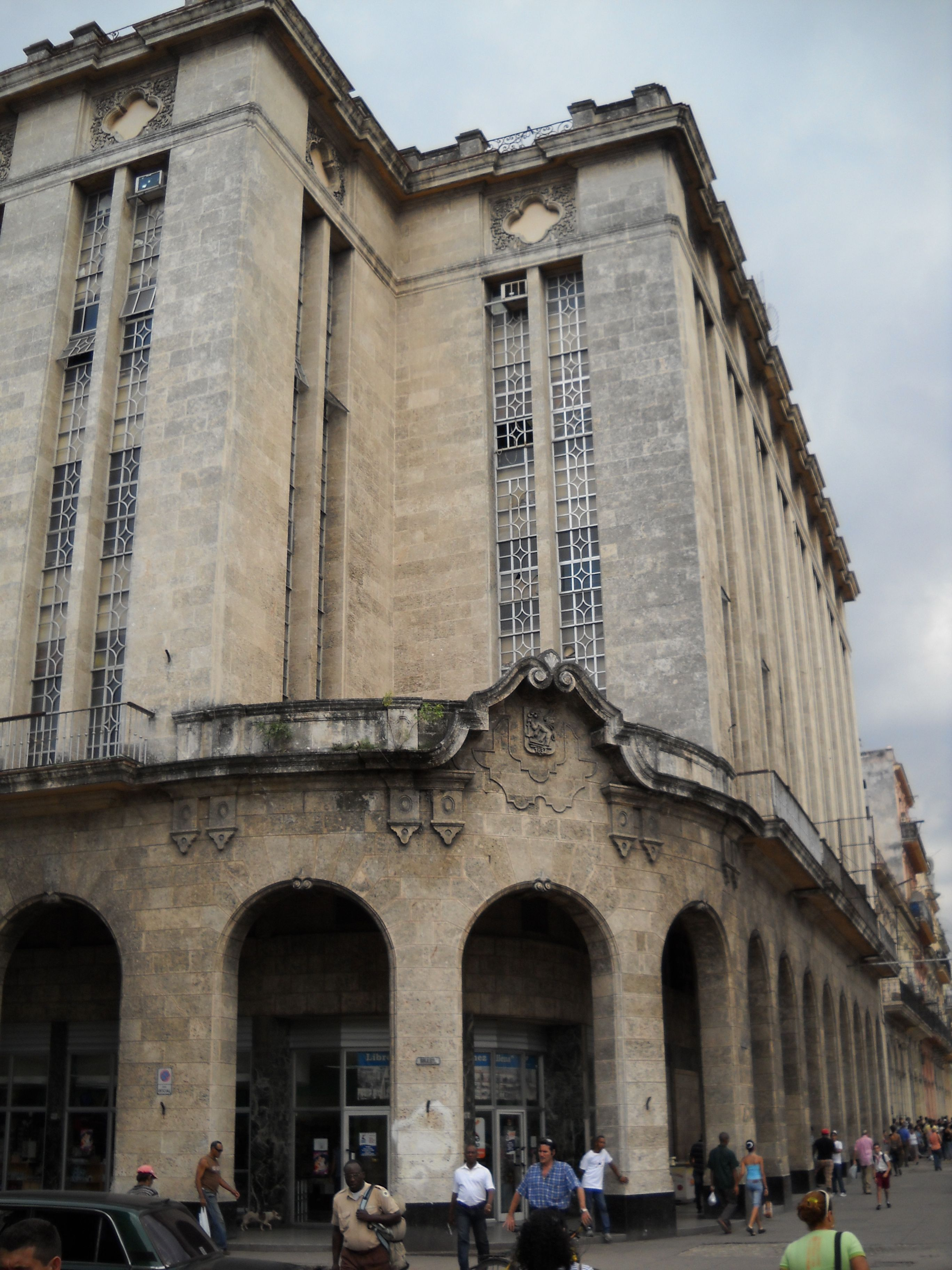
Diario de la Marina building in 2009

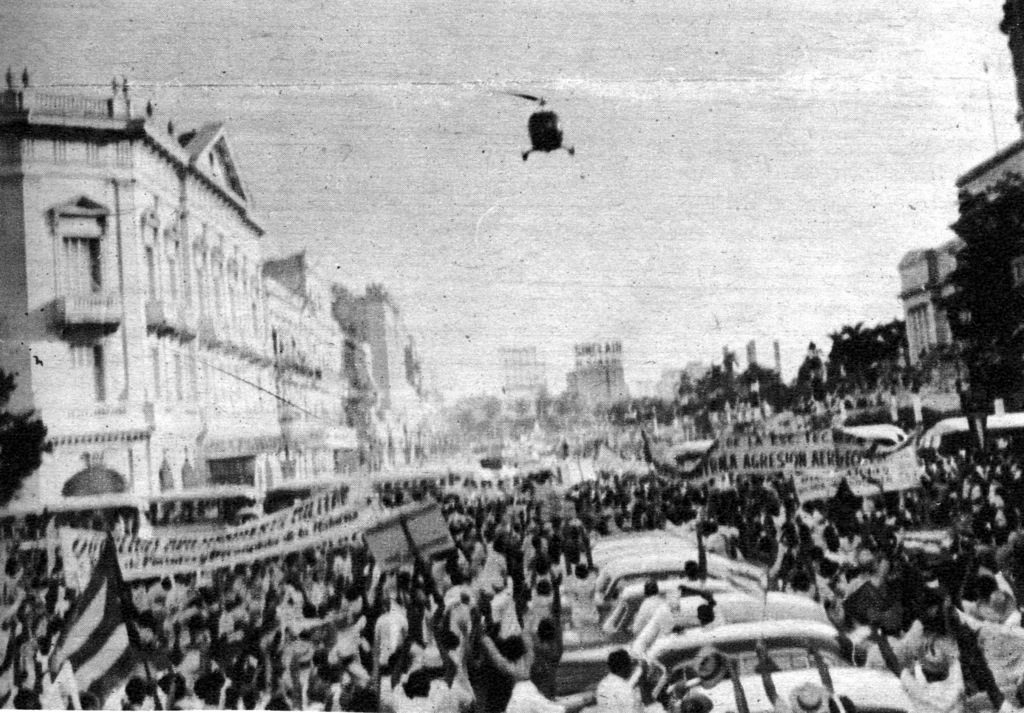
In May 1960, a mob attacked the offices of Diario de La Marina.

In May 1960, a mob attacked the offices of Diario de La Marina.

Soon after the Cuban Revolution led by Fidel Castro that overthrew the Cuban government in 1959, all media - radio, television, and print - underwent a censorship process. Some communications sources were altered while others were closed. Diario de la Marina, due to its anti-Castro position (it had opposed Castro's efforts since well before the revolution) was closed on May 12, 1960, by orders of the government. Armed militiamen and State Security (G2) agents dressed in civilian clothes entered the office premises, expelled employees and vandalized the premises. In-house printers were given a revolutionary tract to publish. Mobs gathered outside the office building, carrying a coffin filled with Diario de la Marina issues, and burned it in a nearby location. The following day, Chief Editor Jose Ignacio Rivero sought political asylum at the Peruvian Embassy. After 128 years, the newspaper had ceased operations.

== Directors in chronologic order ==
Sources:

1. Isidoro Araujo de Lira
2. Dionisio Alcalá Galiano
3. Vincente González Olivares
4. José Manuel Fernández de Castro
5. José Ruiz de León
6. Luciano Pérez de Acevedo
7. Don Juan de Ariza
8. Don Francisco Montagos
9. Fernando Fragoso
10. Luciano Pérez de Acevedo (2nd term)
11. Don Victoriano Otero
12. Don Ramón de Armas y Sánez
13. Don Nicolás Rivero y Muñiz, 1895–1919
14. José Ignacio Rivero y Alonso ("Pepín" Rivero), 1919-1944
  - Ramiro Guerra (Temporary), 1944–1944
15. José Ignacio Rivero y Hernández ("Pepinillo" Rivero) 1944–1960

== Other publications ==
When Prensa Libre wrote critically about the suppression of Diario de la Marina and the imminent loss of freedom of the press in Cuba, it too was seized by the government. Revolutionary mobs, incited by the frenzy of the moment, called for the execution of all the editors who opposed Castro and his Revolution. One by one, Cuban newspapers ceased publication. Only government-controlled publications, like Revolución, El Mundo, Bohemia, and the communist Hoy were allowed to publish but even they were eventually phased out. After the firm establishment of the regime and the supremacy of the Communist Party, only Granma the official organ of the Cuban Communist Party, was allowed to exist.

Bohemia still exists and is officially the oldest magazine in Latin America, but the director Miguel Ángel Quevedo was forced into exile by the Castro regime and replaced with the Bohemia journalist and communist hardliner Enrique de la Osa, when it became a propaganda outlet of the state.
