= Cuban Nationalist Association =

Terrorist organization of Cuban exiles

- Asociación Nacionalista Cubana
- Other name: Cuban Nationalist Movement
- Founding leader: Felipe Rivero Diaz
- Spokesperson: Ignacio Novo Sampol
- Dates active: 1962 – 1989
- Headquarters: 210 West 104th Street, New York City
- Ideology: Anti-communism; Cuban nationalism Neo-fascism
- Political position: Far-right

The Cuban Nationalist Association (or Cuban Nationalist Organization) was a terrorist organization of Cuban exiles who were responsible for a series of bombings against the Castro regime and the Cuban government. The association was a violent offshoot of the Cuban dissident movement. Eventually, the Cuban Nationalist Association changed its name to the "Cuban Nationalist Movement" (MNC). The founder of the organization was Felipe Rivero Diaz.

== Bombing of the Maria Teresa ==
Some time in the evening of August 8, 1963, Royal Canadian Mounted Police (RCMP) received an advanced anonymous warning that there would be an attempt on a Cuban ship in Montreal, Canada.

Before dawn, at 3:11 am on August 9, 1963, a 1.091–ton Cuban Cargo boat called the Maria Teresa was rocked with an explosion in front of her bow while moored at Shed 10 in the harbor at Montreal. The explosion sent a wave 30 feet high, and damaged a few windows in a port building, but the ship remained unharmed. The crew mates of the vessel were still asleep.

After he arrived on the scene, RCMP inspector Ralph Carriere began a search for an oiler aboard the vessel named Manuel Perez Valdez, who went missing in connection with the bombing. His suspicion following the bombing was that he had defected.

A few hours later, the MNC claimed full responsibility for the attack, and said that its commandos had boarded the vessel and stole top secret Cuban government documents before a separate team of frogmen set off an explosive near the ship's hull. However, the vessel suffered no apparent damage, and left port on August 11 bound for Havana.

In their public statement, the MNC wrote that this attack was the commencement of an "offensive war with which our movement, on all fronts, will fulfill its promise of carrying the Cuban war not only to our fatherland but to wherever it is necessary for the accomplishment of our liberation."

After the ship left port, Rivero sent a telegraph to the ship's captain, Maximino Chacon, which read: "Chacon, the fiesta hasn't started yet. We plan a real one when you return."

== Attack on the United Nations ==
The MNC was responsible for the firing of a bazooka at the Headquarters of the United Nations building in 1964.

The United Nations was hosting Che Guevara, who was giving a speech at the time. Guevara did not pause his speech as the bazooka arced across the East River, falling short of its target and splashing down into the water, rattling the windows of the building as it exploded. Later, when Guevara was asked for comment, he said that the explosion "has given the whole thing more flavor," while smoking a Cuban cigar.

The director of the organization at the time was Felipe Rivero. Three men implicated in the attack were Julio Carlos Perez, Ignacio Novo, and Guillermo Novo. Ignacio served as the group's National Secretary General and Guillermo as the New Jersey delegate. Another member, Molly Gonzales attempted to break through UN Security brandishing a knife, who said that she was trying to assassinate Guevara.

After the explosion, the window shades at the chambers of the United Nations Security Council (UNSC) were closed, in order to protect UNSC delegates from shards of glass. These curtains remained closed until 2019, when they were opened again for the first time since the attack.

== Bombing of the Tomb of Karl Marx ==
The Cuban Nationalist Association also claimed responsibility for the bombing of the Tomb of Karl Marx in London.

== Bombing of the Cuban Embassy ==
In 1966, the group was responsible for the bombing of the Embassy of Cuba in Ottawa, Canada.

== Assassination of Orlando Letelier ==
In 1976, the Cuban Nationalist Movement were involved in the assassination of Orlando Letelier in conjunction with Chilean security agents working for Augusto Pinochet. Dionisio Suarez pled guilty.
