= Count of Rivero =

Crown of the Spanish Count

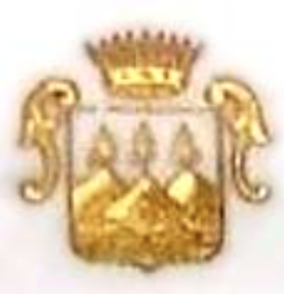
Currently the highest quality image of the Count of Rivero coat of arms.

The Count or Countess of Rivero (Spanish: Condado del Rivero) is a Spanish nobility title, which became a title of the Spanish nobility in Cuba. The 1st Count of Rivero was Nicolás Rivero y Muñiz, who was recognized posthumously. The current Countess of Rivero is Silvia Teresa Jorge y Sosa.

	Name	Reign
Creation by Alfonso XIII
I	Nicolas Rivero y Muniz	1919-1919
II	Nicolas Rivero y Alonso	1919-1946
Rehabilitation by Juan Carlos I
III	Silvia de Sosa y del Rivero	1990-1993
IV	Silvia Teresa Jorge y Sosa	1993-current holder

== History of the Counts of Rivero ==
- Nicolás Rivero y Muñiz (d. Havana, June 4, 1919), 1st Count of Rivero and director of the Diario de la Marina in Havana.

He married Herminia Alonso y Aguilar on April 1, 1868. In the same year of the concession, he was succeeded by his son:

- Nicolás Rivero y Alonso (22 January 1887 – 1946), 2nd Count of Rivero.

He married Estela Machado y Pérez-García. He was succeeded by his great-niece:

Rehabilitated in 1990 by his great-niece:

- Silvia de Sosa y del Rivero (1939–1992), 3rd Countess of del Rivero.

She married Alberto Jorge y de la Cerra in 1959. She was succeeded in 1993 by her daughter:

- Silvia Teresa Jorge y de Sosa (b. 1960), 4th Countess of Rivero and 4th Marchioness of Santa Olalla.

She married Agustín de Goytisolo and Gelats.
