= Félix Lizaso =

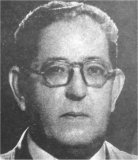
- Born: June 23, 1891; Pipián, La Habana Province, Cuba
- Died: January 9, 1966 (aged 74); Rhode Island

Félix Lizaso (June 23, 1891 – January 9, 1966) was a Cuban writer, literary critic, and scholar known for his extensive work on the life and writings of José Martí. He played a significant role in Cuban intellectual and cultural movements throughout the early and mid-20th century, contributing to both literary criticism and national political discourse. He was present at the Protest of the Thirteen, the first protest of the intellectual movement in Cuba since it had gained independence, was a signatory to the "Manifesto of the Group of Thirteen," and was later a member of the Minorista Group. Over the course of his career, he produced over three hundred literary works on the life and works of José Martí.

Among the magazines that he contributed were; Cuba Contemporánea, Revista de La Habana, Revista Bimestre Cubana, Carteles, Bohemia, Revista de la Biblioteca Nacional, Diario de Cuba, El Mundo, Proa, La vida Literaria, La Prensa, Repertorio Americano, Mercurio Peruano, La Gaceta Literaria, El Libro y el Pueblo, Revista Iberoamericana, Símbolo, América, and La Prensa.

== Early life and education ==
Lizaso was born in Pipián, La Habana Province, Cuba. Lizaso did his first studies in the town of Madruga. In 1898, he moved to Havana with his family and there he graduated from the Institute of Secondary Education, while working in private offices from the age of fifteen.

His collaboration with the press dates back to 1912, when he was 21 years old and published his first work in the newspaper El Andaluz. By 1919 he was already a regular collaborator of El Fígaro, an important newspaper of the time.

== Career and contributions ==
Through Castellanos, Lizaso was introduced to Dominican intellectual Pedro Henríquez Ureña, who became an important mentor. Their correspondence between 1916 and 1924 documents Ureña's influence on Lizaso's early literary career.

In 1919, following Ureña's recommendation, Lizaso accepted a position in the Spanish language department at Princeton University but returned to Cuba in 1920, citing a commitment to national cultural development.

In Havana, he served on the Civil Service Commission until the 1933 revolution that ended the Machado dictatorship.

In 1932, he was co-editor of Surco, under the direction of Fernando Ortiz, and director Cervantes, the art and literature magazine.

In 1923, he participated in the Protest of the Thirteen, a student-led demonstration against government corruption, and was a member of the Grupo Minorista, which advocated for cultural and political reforms. He also contributed to literary initiatives such as the Revista de Avance and the publication of the Anthology of Modern Cuban Poetry (1926), which he co-edited with José Antonio Fernández de Castro.

Lizaso's research was published in periodicals across Latin America and in the twenty volumes of the Archivo de José Martí. His most significant scholarly contributions focused on José Martí, including;

- Unknown Articles of Martí (1930)
- The three-volume Epistolario (1930–1931)
- Passion of Martí (1938)
- Martí, Mystic of Duty (1940)
- Martí, Spirit of the Just War (1944)

Beyond Martí studies, Lizaso wrote on Cuban and Latin American literature and philosophy. His critical works include Ensayistas Contemporáneos (1938) and Panorama of Cuban Culture (1949). He held leadership positions in various cultural institutions, including the Cuban Ministry of Education, the National Academy of Arts and Letters, the Cuban Commission of UNESCO, and the National Archives of Cuba.

== Exile and later years ==
In 1962, Lizaso left Cuba for the United States. His departure marked a period of personal and professional transition, during which he continued to engage with Cuban cultural discourse despite declining health. He contributed to scholarly publications and maintained his advocacy for Martí's legacy.
