= 1940 Constitution of Cuba =

Fundamental law of Cuba from 1940 to 1952

The 1940 Constitution of Cuba was implemented during the presidency of Fulgencio Batista on 10 October 1940. It was primarily influenced by the collectivist ideas that inspired the Cuban Revolution of 1933. Widely considered one of the most progressive constitutions at the time, it provided for land reform, public education, a minimum wage and other social programs. It had 286 articles in 19 sections.

== Origins ==
Despite the fact that some political parties had refused to participate in some elections in anticipation of fraud by the government in power, all parties presented candidates for the election of a Constitutional Assembly in November 1939. Beneath the variety of parties, the two national leaders who had dominated Cuban politics since the ouster of President Gerardo Machado in 1933: former President Ramón Grau and Fulgencio Batista, a military leader who had dominated several recent presidents. Each maneuvered to form coalitions, but public interest was only sufficient to produce a turnout of 57% of the eligible voters. The 76 delegates from nine political parties first elected Grau chairman, but he was removed when the Conservative Party delegates, who had campaigned in opposition to Batista, switched sides and supported Batista's candidate for chairman, Carlos Márquez Sterling. The assembly debated publicly for six months and adopted the constitution at the Capitol in Havana. It was signed on 1 July 1940, in Guáimaro, Camagüey, as a tribute to the anti-colonial revolutionaries who signed a draft of a proposed Cuban constitution there in 1869. A later U.S. Ambassador to Cuba, Philip Bonsal assessed the outcome:

The final product was generally considered enlightened and progressive. It reflected a serious consideration of Cuba's experience and of Cuba's problems. It embodied the hopes and aspirations of many. Some of its clauses may have been, as alleged particularly by conservatives, unworkable. It contained a number of provisions requiring implementing legislation from the Congress. That legislation, in matters affecting the propertied classes and their American allies, was either not forthcoming or was delayed to the very end of the twelve years during which the constitution was in force....

For example, the Constitution established as national policy restrictions on the size of land holdings and an end to common ownership of sugar plantations and sugar mills, but these principles were never translated into legislation.

== Provisions ==
The Constitution of 1940 (a) substantiated voting as a right, obligation and function of the people; (b) endorsed the previously established form of government, specifically republican, democratic and representative; (c) confirmed individual rights and privileges including private property rights; and (d) introduced the notion of collective rights.

Under the Constitution of 1940, the separation between the three branches of government remained, but with obvious distinctions: (a) the role of the prime minister was introduced; (b) the executive branch converted to semi-parliamentary form, where half of its ministers could also be congressmen; and (c) Congress’ form was changed to one member in the house for every 35,000 citizens or greater fraction of 17,500, and nine senators per province.

The Constitution of 1940 ratified the authority and independence of the judiciary. Specifically, the judicial branch remained autonomous and empowered to nominate judges and magistrates. Like the Constitution of 1901, and the U.S. Constitution, Supreme Court justices were appointed by the president and confirmed by the senate. In addition, the Constitution of 1940 instituted a Court of Constitutional and Social Guarantees, known as the Constitutional Court, under the jurisdiction of the Supreme Court. The Constitutional Court was empowered to hear labor and constitutional law disputes and to set remedies for violations.

Under the Constitution of 1940, provincial government was terminated. The provincial councils endured, but were now composed of the mayors of various municipalities incorporated into each province. The governor's power to suspend mayors ceased, while the municipalities gained the right to impose local taxes. Public expenses and budgeting at all levels became subject to a ministerial officer under the auspices of a new Court of Public Administration. A Court of Public Works was instituted.

The constitutional amendment clause was strictly enforced in the Constitution of 1940. A constitutional convention was required to modify the language of the Constitution. Congress was authorized to make minor reforms to the document, provided that the following requirements were adhered to: (a) quorum (joint session); (b) two thirds vote of the total number of legislators; and (c) proposed amendments needed to be approved at two consecutive legislative sessions. The Constitution of 1940 could also be modified via referendum.

The most notable difference between the Constitution of 1901 and the Constitution of 1940 was the addition of constitutional protection for issues relating to family, culture, property and labor. Without constitutional antecedents and expertise in the area of protection of social rights, the drafters of the Constitution of 1940 used as models the Second Spanish Republic's Constitution of 1931 and Germany's Weimar Constitution.

== History ==
The Constitution of 1940 was in effect for 12 years until, in 1952, following a coup d'état by Fulgencio Batista, parts of it were suspended.

In 1953, Fidel Castro's manifesto "History Will Absolve Me" declared the restoration of the 1940 Constitution one of the principal aims of his revolutionary movement. In 1957, he and two of his fellow revolutionaries in the "Manifesto of Sierra Maestra" announced their intention to restore the 1940 Constitution should they succeed in defeating the Batista dictatorship. They delayed doing so until 1976. Without any supervision or proof, the Cuban government claims a referendum that year approved the adoption of a new constitution, the 1976 Constitution of Cuba, which defined the country as a one-party state under the Communist Party of Cuba and replaced the office of Prime Minister of Cuba with the executive office of the president. Proof of statistics have yet to be brought forward as of January 2024.

== Signatories ==
The signers were:

- Antonio Bravo Acosta
- Salvador García Agüero
- César Vilar Aguilar
- Alicia Hernández de la Barca
- Eusebio Mujal Barniol
- Nicolás Duarte Cajides
- Blas Roca Calderio
- Francisco Alomá y Álvarez de la Campa
- Manuel A. Orizondo Caraballé
- Mario Robau Cartaya
- Salvador Acosta Casares
- José A. Fernández de Castro
- Antonio Bravo Correoso
- Mario E. Díhigo
- José Manuel Casanova Diviño
- Emilio A. Laurent Dubet
- Manuel Dorta-Duque
- Ramón Granda Fernández
- Miguel A. Suárez Fernández
- Antonio Martínez Fraga
- Romárico Cordero Garcés
- José Manuel Cortina García, President of the Comisión Coordinadora de la Convención Constituyente
- Ramón Corona García
- Rafael Álvarez González
- Manuel Benítez González
- Ramiro Capablanca Graupera
- Juan Cabrera Hernández
- Rafael Guas Inclán
- Juan B. Pons Jané
- Gustavo Moreno Lastres
- María Esther Villoch Leyva
- Miguel Coyula Llaguno
- Francisco José Prieto Llera
- Mariano Esteva Lora
- Francisco Ichaso Macías
- Orestes Ferrara Marino
- Ramón Grau San Martín
- José R. Andréu Martínez
- Fernando del Busto Martínez
- Simeón Ferro Martínez
- Esperanza Sánchez Mastrapa
- Manuel Mesa Medina
- Delio Núñez Mesa
- Alberto Boada Miquel, Secretary the Constitutional Convention
- Francisco Dellundé Mustelier
- Pelayo Cuervo Navarro
- Amaranto López Negrón
- Emilio Ochoa Ochoa
- Santiago Rey Perna
- Emilio Núñez Portuondo, Secretary the Constitutional Convention
- Joaquín Meso Quesada
- Alberto Silva Quiñones
- Felipe Jay Raoulx
- Fernando del Villar de los Ríos
- Felipe Correoso y del Risco
- Eduardo Rene Chibás Rivas
- Jorge Mañach Robato
- Manuel Parrado Rodés
- César Casas Rodríguez
- Arturo Don Rodríguez
- Félix García Rodríguez
- Primitivo Rodríguez Rodríguez
- Joaquín Martínez Sáenz
- Adriano Galano Sánchez
- Jorge A. Mendigutía Silveira
- Carlos Prío Socarrás
- Carlos Márquez Sterling, President of the Constitutional Convention
- Manuel Fueyo Suárez
- Alfredo Hornedo Suárez
- Miguel Calvo Tarafa
- Quintín Jorge Vernot
- Juan Marinello Vidaurreta

== See also ==
- Constitution of Cuba
