= Protest of the Thirteen =

Cuban historical event

The Protest of the Thirteen (Spanish: Protesta de los Trece), which occurred on March 18, 1923, was a pivotal event in Cuban history, and was the first significant action of the newly established Cuban intellectual class against the government of Cuba, since Cuba had earned its independence from Spain. Led by the young poet and lawyer Rubén Martínez Villena, a group of young intellectual writers – which would later be called the Group of Thirteen (composed of fifteen members, not thirteen) – publicly denounced the administration of President Alfredo Zayas y Alfonso for its corrupt practices, notably what they alleged to be the fraudulent purchase of the Santa Clara convent at an inflated price, which was emblematic of the widespread corruption during that era. The protestors were also concerned about the future of the convent itself, which was the first one constructed in all of Cuba.

== Events ==
The protest took place during a ceremony organized by the Cuban Women's Club at the Academy of Sciences in Havana, organized to honor the Uruguayan teacher Paulina Luisi. During the event, when Secretary of Justice Erasmo Regüeiferos, who had endorsed the controversial purchase of the Santa Clara convent, was about to speak, Villena and his colleagues stood up and interrupted the proceedings. Villena delivered a speech condemning Regüeiferos's actions, stating:

"We protest against the official tainted by public opinion, who has preferred to show high proof of loyalty to a friend rather than defend national interests...

May the presidency and the distinguished attendance that is here forgive, that a group of young Cubans, lovers of this noble feast of the intelligentsia, and who have attended it attracted by the prestige of the noble writer to whom this act is offered, may everyone forgive us that we withdraw.

In this act, Dr. Erasmo Regüeiferos intervenes, who forgetting his past and actions, without warning the serious damage that his gesture would cause, has signed an illicit decree that covers up a repellent and clumsy business, worthy not of this rectification and moral readjustment, but of that first year of Zayism.

May the Minister of Uruguay and his wife forgive us. May the illustrious writer to whom this tribute is so fairly paid forgive us. We protest against the official, who has been crossed out for opinion, and who has preferred to give a high test of adhesion to his friend rather than defend national interests. We are very sorry that Mr. Regüeiferos is here. That's why we are forced to protest and withdraw."

Following this declaration, the group exited the venue, effectively disrupting the ceremony and drawing public attention to their cause.

After leaving the event, the group proceeded to the offices of the newspaper Heraldo de Cuba, where Villena drafted the Manifesto of the Protest of the Thirteen, which articulated their dissatisfaction with the government's corrupt actions. The manifesto emphasized their honor and satisfaction in initiating a movement that opposed officials who were "violators, plunderers, immoral, who tend with their acts to debase the Homeland." This document was signed by thirteen of the fifteen participants, with two abstaining due to personal reasons.

The signatories to the manifesto were;

- Rubén Martínez Villena (Leader of the Group of Thirteen)
- José Antonio Fernández de Castro
- Calixto Masó
- Félix Lizaso
- Alberto Lamar Schweyer (Later became Press Secretary for President Machado)
- Francisco Ichaso
- Luis Gómez Wangüemert
- Juan Marinello Vidaurreta
- José Tallet
- José Manuel Acosta
- Primitivo Cordero Leyva
- Jorge Mañach
- José Luis "J.L." García Pedrosa

On March 21, 1923, Regüeiferos filed a formal indictment against Rubén Martínez Villena and the other participants, and a day later Judge Antonio García Sola opened a case against the thirteen for the crime of insults to the Secretary of Justice. The penalty requested for each of them was 180 days of imprisonment, the maximum sanction in this type of crime. Initially, Fernando Ortiz assumed the defense of the accused, in the Court of Instruction of the First Section of the Havana Court. Numerous intellectuals sent messages to the Heraldo de Cuba offering their support to the accused. In the last days of March, Regüeiferos resigned from his position, while the group members had to appear every Monday, until mid-1924, in the court where the lawsuit was filed against them, at which time it was dismissed.

The thirteen members here, and the two that were absent from the signing of the manifesto, eventually became leaders in Cuban society, each occupying different spheres of that society, each with their own ideological differences – some of which would create further divisions in Cuban society itself.

Villena later wrote a poem in Diario de la Marina, which read;

"It takes a burden to kill rascals, to finish the work of revolutions;
to avenge the dead, who suffer outrage, to clean the tenacious crust of the settlement;
to be able one day, with prestige and reason, to remove the Appendix of the Constitution;
not to make useless, in humiliating luck, the effort and the hunger and the wound and death;
so that the Republic is self-supported, to fulfill Martí's marble dream;
to keep the earth, glorious of spoils, to save the temple of Love and Faith,
so that our children do not beg for fennel the Homeland that the fathers won us standing."

Villena, on April 1, then established the Cuban Action Phalange, or the Falange de Acción Cubana, to carry on the work of the Protest of the Thirteen.

The communist government of Cuba today marks this protest as the awakening of this generation of Cuban intellectuals against governmental corruption. The Group of Thirteen is also considered the parent group of the Minorista Group, which was commonly referred to as the "Vanguard of the Cuban Intelligentsia."
