= 1933 Cuban general strike =

1933 Cuban historical event

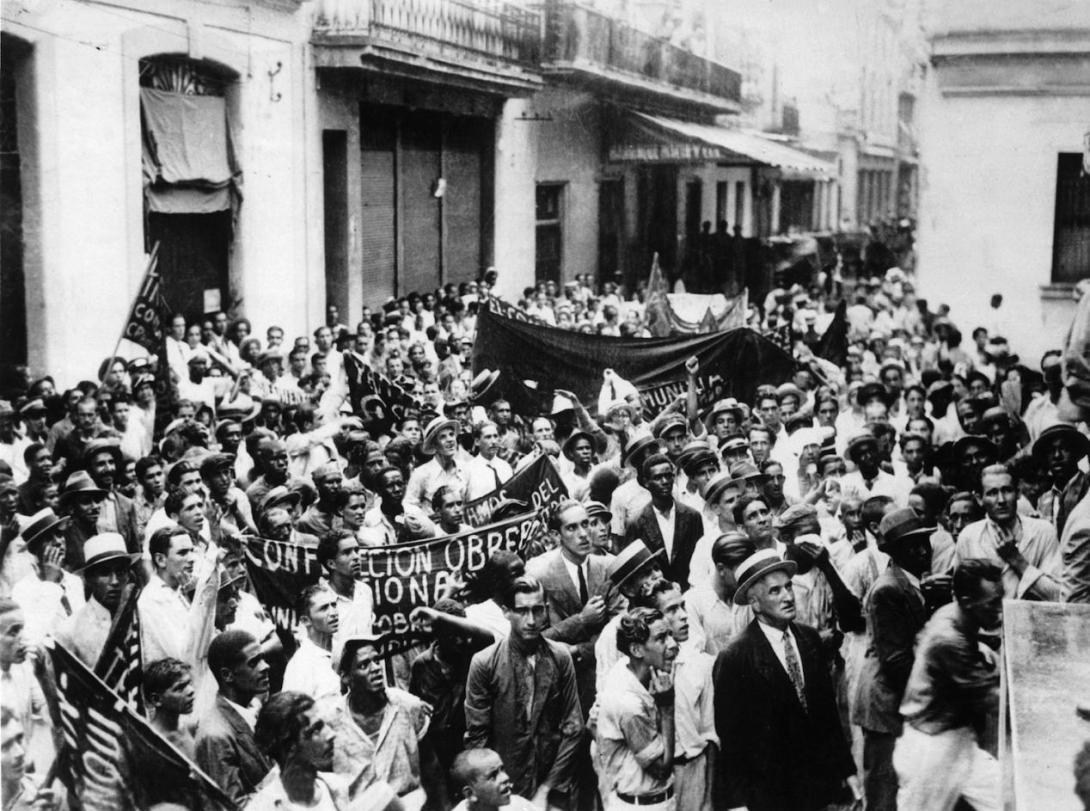
- Date: July 27, 1933 – August 12, 1933
- Location: Cuba
- Caused by: political repression, wage cuts, and poor working conditions
- Goals: overthrow the dictatorship of Gerardo Machado
- Methods: mass protests, work walkouts, interruption of services
- Result: President Machado resigns, seeks refuge in the Bahamas

Parties
| Republic of Cuba | National Confederation of Workers of Cuba; Communist Party of Cuba: Bus drivers union; Cuban veterans association; University Student Directory; ABC Party: Minorista Group; Telegraph workers union; Railway workers union; Hotel and restaurant workers; Physicians; Bakers; Cigarmakers; Sanitation workers; Teachers union; Government communications workers; Treasury Department workers; Sugar mill workers; Plantation workers Support: United States; Soviet Union |

Lead figures
| Gerardo Machado | Rubén Martínez Villena; Fabio Grobart; Joaquín Ordoqui; Jorge Mañach; Francisco Ichaso; Juana María Acosta; Ambassador Sumner Welles |

Casualties and losses
| | 42 (+) killed and hundreds wounded |

The Cuban General Strike of 1933 was a mass labor uprising in Cuba that played a crucial role in the overthrow of President Gerardo Machado during Cuba's political crisis in the early 1930s. The strike, which began in late July 1933, was driven by widespread discontent among workers due to economic hardship, political repression, and the influence of radical labor movements. It was organized by a coalition of labor unions, students, and opposition groups, particularly influenced by the Cuban Communist Party and anarcho-syndicalist organizations. The strike paralyzed industry, transportation, and commerce across the country, demonstrating the power of organized labor in Cuban politics.

The removal of Gerardo Machado was supported by both the United States, who actively called for his removal, and the Communist International of the Soviet Union, which sponsored the Communist Party of Cuba.

== Background ==
In the two years leading up to this movement, Cuba experienced intense efforts to remove Gerardo Machado from power, marked by violent confrontations, bombings, and political assassinations. The main armed opposition group agreed to a ceasefire in July 1933 to allow for mediation, but smaller factions continued sporadic attacks.

The ringleader of the General Strikes was Rubén Martínez Villena, the leader of the Communist Party of Cuba, who had recently returned to Cuba after seeking medical treatment for his tuberculosis in the United States and the USSR.

The head of the Cigar Industry Worker's union, Juana María Acosta, had also recently been elected to be President of the National Confederation of Workers of Cuba (CNOC), the anarcho-syndicalist front of Cuba.

== Events ==
=== Strike ===
The strike initially began on July 27, 1933, with protests by a group of bus drivers against wage cuts and poor working conditions, but quickly escalated into a nationwide movement demanding Machado's resignation. The Cuban labor movement had been gaining strength since the 1920s, with workers in sugar mills, railroads, and urban industries forming militant unions. These organizations coordinated mass demonstrations, factory occupations, and street clashes with government forces. The support of university students, particularly from the University of Havana, further fueled the strike's momentum.

Machado responded with severe repression, deploying police and military units to break the strike through arrests, violence, and censorship. However, as the strike persisted, it gained broader support, including from middle-class professionals and nationalist sectors of society.

On August 1, soldiers opened fire on demonstrators in Havana, killing two people, while in Santa Clara, businesses and theaters shut down. Clashes escalated when police attacked striking teachers, prompting more transportation workers to join the strike. Strikes also spread to Pinar del Río, where tobacco workers, journalists, and drivers participated. Meanwhile, the sugar workers’ union organized protests and hunger marches across the country.

Momentum grew as more sectors joined the strike. Many businesses in Havana closed, fuel stations refused service, and typographers, journalists, and dockworkers walked off the job. The Cuban Communist Party supported workers’ demands while also calling for Machado's removal. Reports indicated numerous strikes throughout the country, leading to the formation of a central strike committee. The National Confederation of Workers of Cuba (CNOC) called for a nationwide general strike starting on August 5.

The government reacted with mass arrests, detaining over a hundred labor leaders and supporters, while also attempting to coerce telegraph operators back to work. Police opened fire on demonstrators, killing twenty and injuring over a hundred. Strike leaders urged people to avoid the streets to prevent further bloodshed.

By August 6, even more groups joined the movement, including railway workers, hotel and restaurant staff, doctors, bakers, and cigarmakers. The situation escalated when employees in key government sectors—Sanitation, Communications, and the Treasury—also walked off the job. In response, electric and telephone companies resorted to locking employees inside their workplaces to prevent them from joining the strike.

The August 6 issue of Bohemia, the most popular magazine in Cuba, issued a condemnation of Machado's actions:

"We would be guilty of insincerity or of pusillanimity if we did not raise our voices in such serious hours. Patriotism is not a sentiment that is satisfied with boisterous rhetoric, showy hangings, fiery speeches and insubstantial and false oaths. Patriotism is demanding, very demanding, and in these moments it imposes on everyone that they act with absolute honesty...

You said a few years ago that you would leave the Presidency the day that there were ten citizens who considered it necessary for the salvation of the Republic. And now your departure from the relationship has been elevated to the category of a national desire...

Out of respect for the sacred memories that you have so often invoked, you must prevent, with a generous manner, that the independence of Cuba suffer an eclipse. A man is never worth more than a people. And history would execrate your name if you put the independence of Cuba in danger with an inappropriate attitude. The anger of the people is uncontrollable...

As long as you occupy the Palace, the Palace will be seen by the people as a symbol of misery, blood and mourning. When you abandon it definitively, the Palace will recover the prestige that corresponds to the First Magistrate of the Nation...

Abandon the Presidency, General."

Facing mounting pressure, the U.S. ambassador urged Machado to step down. The dictator, however, responded with a defiant radio address, declaring his intent to resist U.S. intervention. Attempting to weaken opposition, he offered CNOC official recognition and government support in exchange for ending the strike. CNOC leaders and the Cuban Communist Party backed the proposal, but workers overwhelmingly rejected it and continued their protest.

Shortly after, an underground radio station linked to the anti-Machado ABC resistance group falsely reported that Machado had resigned, calling for a mass demonstration. Despite later corrections from other stations, a large crowd gathered and began marching toward the presidential palace. Before they could reach their destination, police fired on the demonstrators, killing twenty people.

On August 9, the Cuban military, initially carrying out Machado's orders, eventually sided with the protestors and placed Havana under martial law.

The inability of Machado's government to restore order ultimately led to intervention from the U.S. government, which had previously supported him but now sought to stabilize Cuba through political transition. Under pressure from both domestic unrest and diplomatic maneuvering, Machado was forced to resign on August 12, 1933, and fled to the Bahamas.

=== Aftermath ===
Following Machado's departure, the strike contributed to the emergence of a revolutionary period in Cuban politics, culminating in the rise of the short-lived Sergeants' Revolt led by Fulgencio Batista and the establishment of a provisional government under Ramón Grau San Martín. Although the labor movement had demonstrated its political strength, it soon faced repression from the new authorities as Batista consolidated power. The Communist Party of Cuba and other radical labor organizations were sidelined, and many of their leaders were imprisoned or forced underground.

The Cuban General Strike of 1933 is considered a turning point in the island's labor history, marking the first time that workers played a decisive role in overthrowing a government. It demonstrated the potential of mass mobilization to challenge entrenched political elites, setting a precedent for future labor struggles. The strike also underscored the limitations of labor power within a fragile political system, as later governments moved to curb union influence and co-opt labor movements for political purposes.

Rubén Martínez Villena, unable to find a cure for his tuberculosis, died the next year.
