= Minorista Group =

Cuban Avant-garde art movement

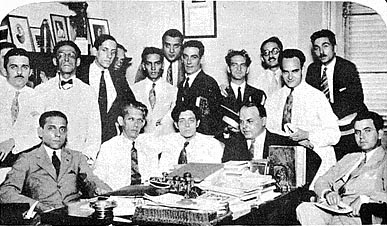
Grupo Minorista, 1927

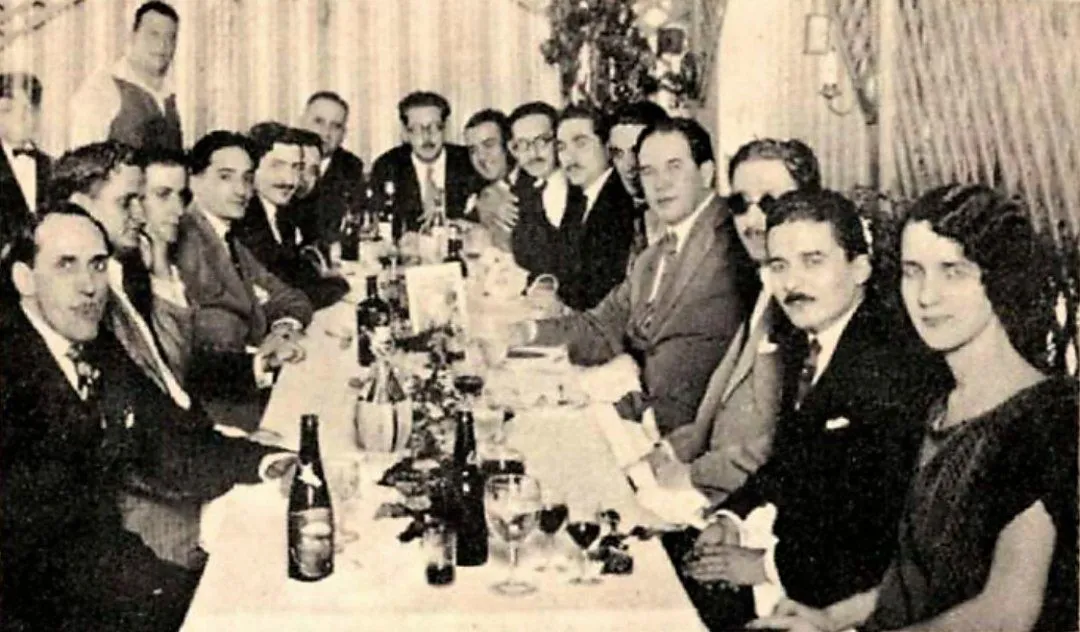
Grupo Minorista, at lunch in 1924, entertaining the opera singer Titta Ruffo (seated center right)

The Minorista Group, or Retail Group (Spanish: Grupo Minorista), was an avant-garde group of Cuban artists, writers, philosophers, poets, and others collectively called the "vanguard of the intelligencia," active during the 1920s that had an enormous influence on events in Cuban politics and society in the early half of the twentieth century. The Minorista Group was founded in 1923 by Rubén Martínez Villena. The Minorista Group was created after the events of the Protest of the Thirteen, which had been led by Villena, and came to challenge the administration of Alfredo Zayas y Alfonso. The original protest was against the sale of the Santa Clara convent by the government for corrupt purposes.

The group met on Saturdays at the Hotel Lafayette in Havana.

== Collaborative projects ==
The Minoristas were not only officially responsible for the creation of Revista de Avance, but also primarily held the leadership roles at the popular magazine Social.

In 1926, no fewer than eleven Minoristas collaborated to write the novel "Fantoches 1926." Each month, a different member would contribute a chapter to the book. Carlos Loveira wrote the first and last chapters of the book. The final chapter of Fantoches 1926 was illustrated by Conrado Walter Massaguer. Fantoches 1926 was published in twelve serial installments in Social.

== Contemporary society ==
In 2023, on the Centenary of the Minoristas founding, the German artist Hans Winkler opened an exhibit called the "Minorista Cafe," at the Cuban National Museum of Fine Arts. This exhibit was intended to show a link between the Minoristas and the Dada movement.

== Members ==
- Rubén Martínez Villena
- Juan Marinello
- Conrado Walter Massaguer
- Oscar H. Massaguer (Business manager of Social and Carteles)
- Agustín Acosta Bello
- José Manuel Acosta Bello
- Manuel García (Víctor Manuel)
- Alejandro García Caturla
- Alejo Carpentier
- José Zacharías Tallet
- Carlos Loveira
- Alberto Lamar Schweyer (Later became Machado's press secretary)
- Alfonso Hernández Catá (Later the Cuban ambassador to Madrid)
- Jorge Mañach (Later expelled from the group)
- Max Henríquez Ureña
- Dora Alonso
- José Antonio Fernández de Castro
- Martí Casanovas
- Francisco Ichaso
