= Miguel Fernández Roig =

Cuban labor leader and cigar roller (1894–1948)

- Fernández Roig c. 1948
- Born: 15 June 1894; Havana, Captaincy General of Cuba
- Died: 2 April 1948 (aged 53); Havana, Cuba
- Cause of death: Assassination
- Occupations: Trade unionist; Cigar roller

Miguel Fernández Roig (Note: In this name that follows Hispanic American naming customs, the first or paternal surname is Fernández and the second or maternal family name is Roig.) (15 June 1894 – 2 April 1948) was a Cuban labor leader, trade unionist, and cigar roller. He was a member of the Cuban Communist Party (Note: The original Cuban Communist Party became the Popular Socialist Party in January 1944.) and served as general secretary of the tobacco workers' union.

== Biography ==
Fernández Roig was born in 1894 to a poor family in the Luyanó neighborhood of Havana, Cuba. His mother Ramona Roig was a housewife, and his father Antonio Fernández was a tobacco worker. Fernández Roig's involvement in organizing labor began at the age of 20. He worked in the La Corona cigar factory. In 1938, he was elected organizing secretary of the Sindicato de Torcedores de La Habana (transl. Havana Cigar Makers' Union), and in 1940 he became general secretary.

== Death ==
In 1948, the Cuban Ministry of Labor and Eusebio Mujal-affiliated ("mujalista") officials attempted to seize control of cigar factories from tobacco industry workers who were affiliated with the Popular Socialist Party (PSP). They engaged in a "campaign of violence", enlisting the help of gangsters to target workers inside the factories. Similarly, the administrator of La Corona factory collaborated with gangsters and Confederation of Cuban Workers (CTC) bureaucrats ("cetekarios") to intimidate the workers; Fernández Roig and the cigar makers' union resisted.

At around 11 a.m. on 2 April 1948, Fernández Roig was speaking in front of other cigar workers, updating them on the labor dispute. Suddenly, a group led by Manuel Campanería Rojas (Note: At that time, Campanería Rojas was the new anti-communist leader of the National Federation of Tobacco Workers (FTN), or Federación Tabacalera Nacional in Spanish.) rushed into the room and tried to take the microphone from him. After a brief struggle, the men shot and killed Fernández Roig. Police recovered .45 and .35 caliber pistols at the scene. Campanería Rojas was not charged with murder; he did not face punishment until he was imprisoned after the Cuban Revolution in 1959.

Thousands of mourners attended Fernández Roig's funeral. Despite Fernández Roig's death and mujalista officials' attempts to intervene in the tobacco industry, the PSP's presence in the tobacco unions was not diminished, and they remained influential in the tobacco industry into the 1950s. In the 1960s, after the revolution, the La Corona cigar factory was renamed after Fernández Roig.

== See also ==
- Jesús Menéndez, politician and leader of the sugar workers union, assassinated in January 1948
- Aracelio Iglesias, leader of the dockworkers union, assassinated in October 1948
