= Jesús Menéndez =

Cuban labor leader and communist politician (1911–1948)

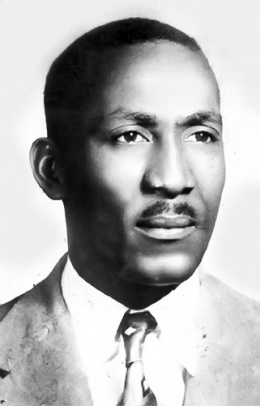
- c. 1945

Representative in the Congress of Cuba
- In office 1940 – 22 January 1948

Personal details
- Born: Jesús Menéndez Larrondo; 14 December 1911 Encrucijada, Cuba
- Died: 22 January 1948 (aged 36) Manzanillo, Cuba
- Cause of death: Assassination
- Party: Communist Revolutionary Union
- Occupation: Trade unionist; Sugarcane cutter; Sugar mill worker

Jesús Menéndez Larrondo (14 December 1911 – 22 January 1948) was a Cuban labor leader, trade unionist, and communist politician. From a young age, he worked on the sugarcane fields and in sugar mills, and he began to organize his fellow sugar workers in strike actions, even as he faced retaliation from the government. He founded several trade unions, including the National Federation of Sugar Workers (Note: In Spanish: Federación Nacional de Obreros Azucareros (FNOA) and later known as Federación Nacional de Trabajadores Azucareros.) (FNTA), which he led as general secretary. In 1940, Menéndez was elected to the House of Representatives in the Congress of Cuba, representing the Communist Revolutionary Union party.

Menéndez and the FNTA were involved in trade negotiations between Cuba and the United States after the end of World War II. He introduced important clauses into the agreement in 1946 that tied sugar workers' wages to the price paid for sugar, which increased year over year; this, combined with the increased post-war sugar exports to the US, was a boon to sugar workers. He also compelled the Cuban government to agree to pay out the trade differential as a bonus to the sugar workers. When the US tried to drastically decrease their Cuban sugar imports the following year, Menéndez fought for the higher trade levels, arguing that they were essential to stave off mass unemployment and nationwide economic hardship in Cuba. Despite interference from the Cuban government, the FNTA voted to strike for better wages and reelect Menéndez general secretary.

In January 1948, Menéndez was assassinated by Joaquín Casillas, a captain in the Cuban Rural Guard, at the train station in Manzanillo. Menéndez had just started a trip through the Oriente province to help sugar workers engage in collective bargaining before the start of the sugarcane season. The killing was widely condemned and sparked protest strikes. Menéndez was remembered for his labor activism and memorialized as the General de las Cañas (lit. 'General of the Sugarcane').

== Early and personal life ==
Jesús Menéndez was born on 14 December 1911 to a large working-class family on "La Palma" farm on the outskirts of the rural town of Encrucijada. His father was Carlos Menéndez, a captain in the Mambí army in the Sagua la Grande area, and his mother was Adela Larrondo. When he was 11 years old, his mother died, and he had to live with his aunt. He left school after fourth grade to work on the Yaba and Merceditas plantations, cutting sugarcane. When he was 17, he purged and cured sugar at the Constancia mill; during the off-season, he sorted raw tobacco.

Recognizing the way that he and his fellow workers on the fields and in the mills were being exploited, Menéndez developed class consciousness and joined the local union for the Constancia mill. In 1929, when he was 18 years old, he was elected general secretary of the union. Later, he led a hunger march of tobacco workers. His labor organizing landed him in "El Principe" prison several times.

Menéndez with his wife Zoila and three of his four children, c. 1947

Later, Menéndez married Zoila América Cervera, and they had four children: Carlos Jesús, Nardo, Adela, and Teresita.

== Trade unionism ==
=== Labor insurgency: 1930s ===
In Menéndez's lifetime, Cuba was a monoculture economy that primarily exported sugar; thanks to a boom cycle between 1895 and 1920, it became the largest sugar producer in the world. When this sugar boom collapsed during the Great Depression, many Cuban sugarcane cutters were laid off. In the wake of this economic hardship, Menéndez founded the National Union of Sugar Industry Workers (Note: In Spanish: Sindicato Nacional Obrero de la Industria Azucarera (SNOIA).) in 1932. He was also involved in the National Workers Confederation of Cuba (CNOC) (Note: Also called "Cuban National Workers Confederation" in English.) in the early 1930s.

The sugar workers' labor insurgency made them a major political force in Cuba. In 1933, they went on strike and formed worker councils called soviets, occupying 36 sugar mills and estates. The strike expanded to a general strike and ultimately led to the downfall of the Machado dictatorship. Ramón Grau assumed the presidency briefly in 1934, but popular discontent and US intervention led to a successful coup by Fulgencio Batista, replacing Grau with Carlos Mendieta. The unions launched another general strike in the spring of 1935, but Mendieta's government declared a "state of war", violently suppressed acts of dissent, and dissolved the striking unions. The CNOC was outlawed for participating in the strike and had to move operations underground.

Menéndez continued to organize. Following the US Sugar Act of 1937, which guaranteed Cuba a 28.6 percent share of the US market, he founded the National Federation of Sugar Workers (FNTA) in 1939 and was elected to lead that organization as its general secretary. He also cofounded a trade union federation called the Confederation of Cuban Workers (CTC) with Lázaro Peña. Menéndez's advocacy expanded his profile, leading to his appointment to the constituent assembly in 1939 and then election to the House of Representatives in the Congress of Cuba in 1940 for the Communist Revolutionary Union party.

=== Sugar worker wages: 1940s ===
The global sugar markets were disrupted during World War II, and the US lost access to many of its sugar suppliers. (Note: There were shortages of agricultural supplies and fewer ships to transport cargo. Also, Japan invaded the Philippines and attacked shipments from Hawaii, and Nazi u-boats attacked shipments from the Virgin Islands and Puerto Rico.) Cuba was able to step in and sell its entire sugar crop to the US. These increased sugar sales, beyond the pre-war market share percentage set in 1937, continued until the end of the war, when Cuba began pushing for higher sugar prices.

Menéndez speaking, possibly c. 1940

In 1945, Cuba and the US entered another round of sugar trade negotiations. Menéndez and the National Federation of Sugar Workers (FNTA) initially tried to join the talks, but the Cuban government under President Grau (then in his second presidency) blocked them from participating. Menéndez was able to join the negotiation team the following year when talks resumed in Havana. He used this opportunity to push for a "Guarantee Clause" in the trade agreement which "linked the price paid for sugar to the inflation of goods imported from the [US]". There was also an "escalator" clause which set the minimum price of sugar based on the previous year's price, thereby increasing the price of sugar with inflation year over year. These clauses would ensure that workers' wages increased in line with inflation, allowing them to continue to purchase expensive necessities imported on to the island. Menéndez and the FNTA also successfully pushed the Cuban government to agree to pay out the differential from the trade negotiations as a bonus to the workers. This bonus, amounting to 10 percent, would be calculated based on their new, higher 1946 wage levels.

However, in 1947, the US sought to reduce their Cuban sugar imports back to the pre-war 28.6 percent market share, which would drop their imported Cuban sugar from 5.7 million tons to 3.2 million tons. Menéndez campaigned for the higher trade levels—even securing an interview with the US Secretary of Agriculture, thanks to the help of Jacob Potofsky of the Congress of Industrial Organizations. The economic outlook for the Cuban workers was dire, as he argued in a statement to The New York Times: "More than 60 percent of Cuba's working population is engaged in the production of sugar. If this production is reduced ... Cuba faces wholesale unemployment and deterioration of living standards". Despite Menéndez's best efforts, the Cuban government approved a new treaty on 25 July, annulling the "Guarantee Clause" that he had fought for. The promised bonus for the sugar workers never came to pass.

Anticipating union action over depreciated wages, Cuba's Labor Minister tried to suspend the FNTA congress in November 1947. However, the FNTA defied the government and held their congress anyway, "unanimously" reelecting Menéndez as general secretary and voting to fight for their previous wage levels and an 8 percent differential (compared to the 10 percent they had been promised). In response, the Cuban government declared Menéndez's election illegal and raided his offices. The government also held their own "'official' congress" to elect an anti-communist leader, essentially splitting the FNTA into two factions. When Menéndez's faction protested against these actions, the government sent guardsmen and "Auténtico CON toughs" to suppress dissent.

== Assassination ==
As the start of the sugar harvest drew close in January 1948, Menéndez planned to travel across the Oriente province to help sugar mill workers negotiate better labor terms through collective bargaining. He was accompanied by communist politician Paquito Rosales and trade unionist Manuel Quesada. As their train neared Manzanillo, the first stop on their trip, Captain Joaquín Casillas of the Rural Guard tried to arrest Menéndez and Quesada, saying that they were suspected of breaking the law. Menéndez asserted that, as an elected congressional representative, the constitution gave him parliamentary immunity. Casillas replied that he would take them in, "dead or alive".

When the train reached the station, Casillas shot and killed Menéndez. The army claimed that Menéndez had fired a weapon. Multiple accounts stated that Menéndez was shot in the back as he exited the train. Politician Eduardo Chibás called the killing "an outrageous crime" and a "deliberate attack by the government against the working class", and Carteles magazine reported that it was widely understood to be an "assassination". Several days later, Time magazine reported that "a dozen top government officials and almost all newspapers denounced the shooting".

An autopsy performed on Menéndez showed that he was shot from behind. Given this evidence and the fact that Casillas did not deny shooting Menéndez, a magistrate indicted Casillas for murder and ordered him held without bail. However, days later, the judge suddenly transferred the case to the military. After this, Casillas faced no punishment.

=== Downfall of Casillas ===
Clockwise from top left: Commander Bordón; the three rebels credited with finding Casillas; Casillas after he was captured

Casillas continued to serve in the army until the events of the Cuban Revolution culminated in the battle of Santa Clara in late December 1958. He was in charge of defending the city against the advancing rebel army of the 26th of July Movement. When the rebels surrounded the city, Casillas disguised himself as a civilian "wearing a straw hat and a July 26 armband" and tried to escape, but he was caught. The rebels locked him in a cell in his own barracks. A special "edicion de la libertad" or "liberty edition" of Bohemia reported that three revolutionaries were responsible for his capture: Captain Amaury Troyano, Tony Martínez, and Pablo Soto, whereas other accounts only credit commander Víctor Bordón.

Casillas initially tried to talk his way out of imprisonment, but his demeanor changed when Bordón informed him that he would be taken to Che Guevara. Bordón's account implies that Guevara met Casillas face-to-face, saying, "I remember that when Che saw him, he told him: 'Ah! So you are the murderer of Jesús Menéndez.'" Bohemia magazine reported that Casillas was shot after he tried to wrestle a weapon from a guard. Historian Jon Lee Anderson writes that, given Casillas' "brutal history of past atrocities" and Guevara's pattern of "revolutionary justice", Casillas may have been executed by "a hastily assembled firing squad".

== Legacy ==
Menéndez's funeral procession in 1948

After he was assassinated, Menéndez's body was transferred to Havana, and he lay in state at El Capitolio. His funeral was attended by 150,000 people. Sugar workers held protest strikes over his loss. A group called "The Committee for a Home, Care, and Education of the Orphans of Jesús Menéndez" (Note: In Spanish: "El Comité Pro Casa, Atención y Educación para los Huérfanos de Jesús Menéndez") was formed and raised enough funds through donations to build a house for Menéndez's family later that year.

The Cuban poet Nicolás Guillén memorialized Menéndez in a poem called Elegia a Jesús Menéndez and coined the posthumous appellation General de las Cañas (lit. 'General of the Sugarcane'). In his elegy, Guillén invokes supernatural imagery of Shango mythology and characterizes Menéndez as Shango, the god of thunder:

Entonces llegará,
General de las Cañas, con su sable
hecho de un gran relámpago bruñido;

— Guillen (1:436)
Translation:

Then he will arrive,
General Sugarcane, with his saber
made of a great burnished lightning bolt.

— Translation by Ian Smart

== See also ==
- Miguel Fernández Roig, leader of the tobacco workers union, murdered in April 1948
- Aracelio Iglesias, leader of the dockworkers union, murdered in October 1948
