= Francisco Ichaso =

Cuban journalist (1901–1932)

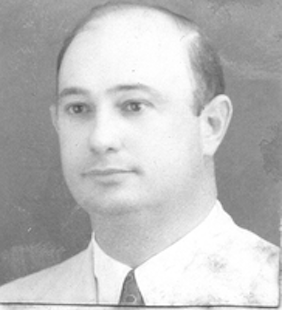

Director of the Press and Information Office of the Presidential Palace of Cuba
- In office 1934

Member of the Havana City Council

Personal details
- Born: October 10, 1901 Cienfuegos, Las Villas
- Died: October 28, 1962 (aged 61)

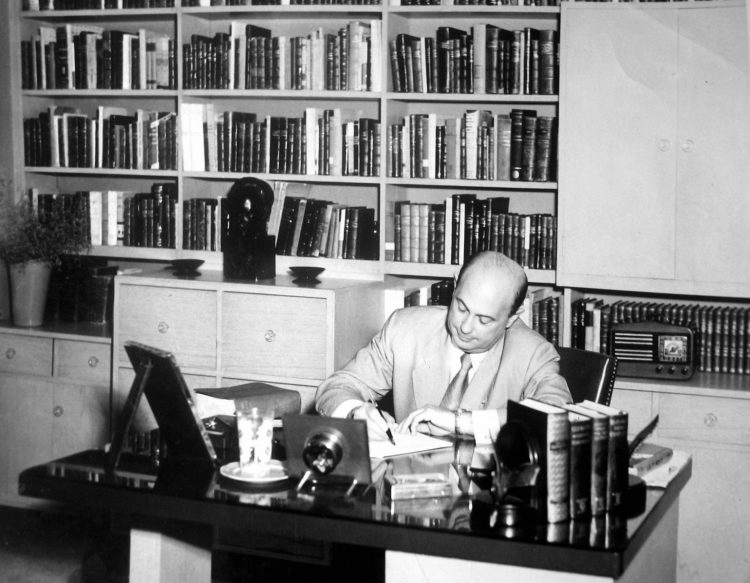
Francisco Ichaso, seen here in his office at CMQ, Havana.

Francisco Ichaso Macías was a Cuban journalist, lawyer, and political thinker who played a significant role in Cuba’s intellectual and political landscape during the early and mid-20th century. He served as a member of the Havana City Council, and Director of the Press and Information Office. He was a member of the Minorista Group, and the President of PEN International's Cuba Club. He was also present at the Protest of the Thirteen, the first major protest of the Cuban intellectual class since Cuban independence.

== Early life and education ==
Born in Cienfuegos, Las Villas, Ichaso was the son of León Ichaso Díaz, a Basque writer and journalist, and Rafaela Macías Guerra, of Canarian descent. He was the eldest of five children. His family relocated to Havana when his father became deputy director of Diario de la Marina, one of Cuba's leading newspapers. Ichaso was educated at the Colegio de Belén and later earned a Doctorate in Law from the University of Havana at the age of 21.

== Career as a journalist ==
Ichaso began writing for Diario de la Marina in his youth, serving as a critic of theater, film, and music, as well as a political columnist. He contributed regularly to Bohemia and was a founding member of Revista de Avance and the newspaper Denuncia.

During the 1920s, Ichaso was an active participant in Cuba’s intellectual movements. On May 18, 1923, he took part in the Protest of the Thirteen, a demonstration against the administration of President Alfredo Zayas Alfonso, and was a signatory to the "Manifesto of the Group of Thirteen." Later, he was a member of the Minorista Group, a collective that sought to address corruption and advocate for social change.

== Political involvement ==
Ichaso co-founded the ABC political party alongside Joaquín Martínez Sáenz, Jorge Mañach Robato, and Carlos Saladrigas Zayas. The party was instrumental in opposing the government of President Gerardo Machado Morales. Following Machado’s downfall, Ichaso was appointed Director of the Press and Information Office of the Presidential Palace and later elected as a city councilor.

In 1932, Ichaso was one of the members of the Cuban Artists and Writers, including Ofelia Rodríguez Acosta, and Jorge Mañach, who urged the Governor of Alabama to stay the execution of the Scottsboro Boys.

His advocacy for human rights was reflected in his 1937 book, Defensa del Hombre, which examined the ideological tensions between democratic liberalism and totalitarian regimes. The work received the prestigious Justo de Lara Award.

In 1939, Ichaso was elected as the ABC delegate for Havana to the 1940 Constituent Assembly. During the drafting of the new constitution, he maintained a moderate stance in the legislative debates.

== Later career and exile ==
Ichaso had a prolific career in later life working for CMQ, where he was involved in radio and television programs such as La Universidad del Aire and Ante la Prensa. He also taught at the Manuel Márquez Sterling School of Journalism and worked as a legal representative for the Association of Settlers of Cuba and the "Electricity Company." As a journalist, he received several of the main laurels of the guild in the republican period, including Juan Gualberto Gómez, Justo de Lara and José Ignacio Rivero.

In 1953, he served as Secretary of the Centenary Commission of José Martí and was an executive producer for the film La Rosa Blanca. From 1957 to 1959, he presided over the Cuban National Commission of UNESCO.

Following the Cuban Revolution and the rise of Fidel Castro in 1959, Ichaso was accused of supporting the previous Batista government. He was imprisoned in Castillo del Príncipe for a year, during which he suffered a heart attack and experienced deteriorating health due to inadequate medical care. He was also suffering from the effects of diabetes that were not treated properly by the prison, and suffered inhumane treatment by the guards.

Upon his release, he was placed under house arrest before seeking asylum at the Mexican Embassy. He left Cuba in the early 1960s and settled in Mexico.

Despite his declining health, Ichaso continued his journalistic work until his death on October 28, 1962. His final editorial for El Excélsior de México was published posthumously, accompanied by an obituary recognizing his dedication to Cuba.
