= Esperanza Sánchez Mastrapa =

Cuban pharmacist, feminist activist, and lawmaker (1901 – after 1958)

- Sánchez Mastrapa in 1940

Delegate in the 1940 Constitutional Assembly
- In office November 1939 – 1940

Representative in the Congress of Cuba
- In office 1944 – September 1950

Personal details
- Born: Esperanza Sánchez Mastrapa; 1901 Gibara, Oriente, (Note: Now known as Holguín province.) Cuba
- Died: After 1958 Havana, Cuba
- Party: Cuban Communist Party (Note: The original Cuban Communist Party became the Popular Socialist Party in January 1944.) (until 1950); Authentic Party (from 1950)
- Occupation: Pharmacist

Esperanza Sánchez Mastrapa (Note: In this Spanish name, the first or paternal surname is Sánchez and the second or maternal family name is Mastrapa.) (1901 – after 1958) was a Cuban pharmacist and politician who was the first Afro-Cuban woman elected to the Congress of Cuba. She was a feminist activist and labor organizer in her community. In 1950, she was denounced by the Popular Socialist Party and joined the rival Authentic Party.

== Early life ==
Sánchez Mastrapa was born to a working-class family in Gibara, Cuba. With her family's support, she excelled in school and received her Bachillerato (transl. high school diploma) with honors from the Provincial Institute in Santiago de Cuba. Afterwards, she attended the University of Havana and ultimately graduated with a Doctorate in Pharmacy. She credited one of the founders of the original Cuban Communist Party, Julio Antonio Mella, with helping her develop her Marxist ideology when she was a student. After graduation, she moved back home to run a pharmacy.

== Labor activism ==
Sánchez Mastrapa founded the Unión Laborista de Mujeres (transl. Women's Labor Union, ULM) with Rosa Pastora Leclerc, which was soon renamed to the Unión Radical de Mujeres (transl. Radical Women's Union, URM). The URM's charter was to "[improve] poor women's working conditions" and "[mobilize] Afro-Cuban women". Sánchez Mastrapa led the URM chapter in her hometown of Gibara. She used her position as a local URM leader to build a network of contacts in the labor movement and advocate for workers rights during strikes and labor disputes. Her activism made her "overwhelmingly popular in the Oriente province, especially among women".

== Political career ==
For the first 30 years of Sánchez Mastrapa's life, women were barred from voting or holding public office in Cuba. Then, in 1933, a general strike and popular movement toppled the Machado dictatorship. Ramón Grau ascended to the presidency, and his brief "Hundred Days Government" enacted women's suffrage in 1934.

In 1939, Sánchez Mastrapa was elected to the Constitutional Convention as a delegate representing the Cuban Communist Party. The purpose of the Convention was to draft a new constitution. Sánchez Mastrapa served as secretary of the Commission on Organizations, Citizenship, and Immigration, which ultimately added language to the constitution that banned discrimination based on race, sex, or class.

In 1944, she was the first Afro-Cuban woman elected to the Congress of Cuba. She was re-elected in 1948.

=== Expulsion from Communist Party ===
In September 1950, Sánchez Mastrapa was strongly denounced by the leadership of the Communist Party—then called the Popular Socialist Party (PSP)—for "cowardice and desertion", and they made numerous allegations against her. One accusation was that she did not express public support for the party after its newspaper offices were raided by the government; another claim was that she had taken her salary directly, instead of giving the party a portion (which was customary). There was also a rumor that she had married someone outside of the party. PSP leader Blas Roca accused her of opportunism and said she lacked knowledge of Marxist theory, writing: "a woman, poor, and black, she would never have been anything outside the Communist Party". Historians Manuel Ramírez Chicharro and Michelle Chase suggest that the defamation against Sánchez Mastrapa was "catalyzed" by existing racialized tensions in the party.

Ramírez Chicharro and Chase also note that, even though the party's denunciations imply that she was expelled, Sánchez Mastrapa may have left the party on her own. Around the same time in September 1950, she had aligned herself with the "moderate" and "reformist" Authentic Party. The Authentic Party had already assassinated several PSP-affiliated labor leaders and also ousted the PSP from the Confederation of Cuban Workers (CTC), so Sánchez Mastrapa may have swapped allegiances as an act of self-preservation. In any case, she was characterized as a traitor. One high-profile party member, Salvador García Aguero, wrote: "one only leaves our party either killed in glory, like [Julio Antonio] Mella and [Jesús] Menéndez, or expulsed in opprobrium like Esperanza Sánchez".

According to Ramírez Chicharro and Chase: "there is no record of her post-1959 activities, although she apparently lived in Havana until her death".
