= Luis Gómez Wangüemert =

Spanish-Cuban journalist

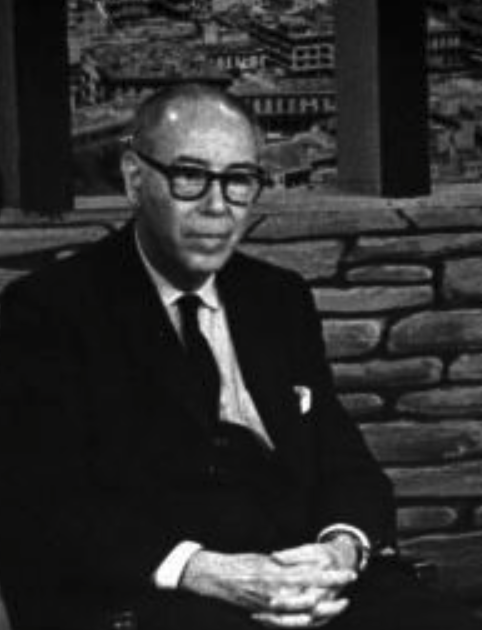
- Born: April 15, 1901; Santa Cruz de la Palma, Canary Islands
- Died: September 12, 1980 (aged 79); Havana
- Awards: Spanish Cross of the Republic; Gold Medal from the Cuban Red Cross

Lorenzo Luis Gómez-Wangüemert was a Spanish-Cuban journalist, editor, and television commentator known for his precision and dedication to journalism. He was part of the Protest of the Thirteen, the first protest of the intellectual class of Cuba since the country had gained its independence. Many years later his own son, José Luis, was killed while undertaking the assault of the Cuban Presidential Palace. Most Cubans would know him for his appearances for many years as a commentator on CMQ-TV.

== Life ==
Gómez-Wangüemert was born in Santa Cruz de la Palma, Canary Islands, on April 15, 1901. His father was Jose Luis Felipe Gómez Wangüemert, the prominent Spanish journalist. His family moved to Cuba at 16, where he pursued studies at the Institute of Secondary Education in Havana and briefly studied law before fully dedicating himself to journalism.

On March 18, 1923, Gómez-Wangüemert was part of the Protest of the Thirteen, signing his name on the "Manifesto of the Group of Thirteen."

Gómez-Wangüemert wrote for influential Cuban publications, including Mundial, Bohemia, and Carteles, and co-founded the literary magazine Talía. He joined Heraldo de Cuba in 1924 as an editor and later became its editor-in-chief. He also directed Magazine de la Raza and contributed to Cuba y la URSS and El Crisol.

A key figure at El Mundo, Gómez-Wangüemert held leadership roles twice before becoming its director in 1961, a position he maintained until its closure in 1968. He was also a well-known international commentator on CMQ-TV, where he became a familiar presence in Cuban households.

His colleagues in the journalistic community held him in high regard for what they believed was professional rigor – as an example, he personally reviewed every obituary in El Mundo before approving publication. He was also a bibliophile, who collected a library of 7,000 volumes.

After the death of his son, José Luis "Pepe" Gómez Wangüemert, in the 1957 assault on the Presidential Palace, he returned to work, telling colleagues, "Let's get to work!"

Gómez-Wangüemert was also an active member of international organizations, serving on the Cuban Movement for Peace and Sovereignty of the Peoples and as Vice President of the Cuban-Soviet Friendship Association. He represented Cuba at UNESCO conferences in Florence (1950) and Paris (1951).
