= Rubén Martínez Villena =

Cuban writer and revolutionary leader (1899–1934)

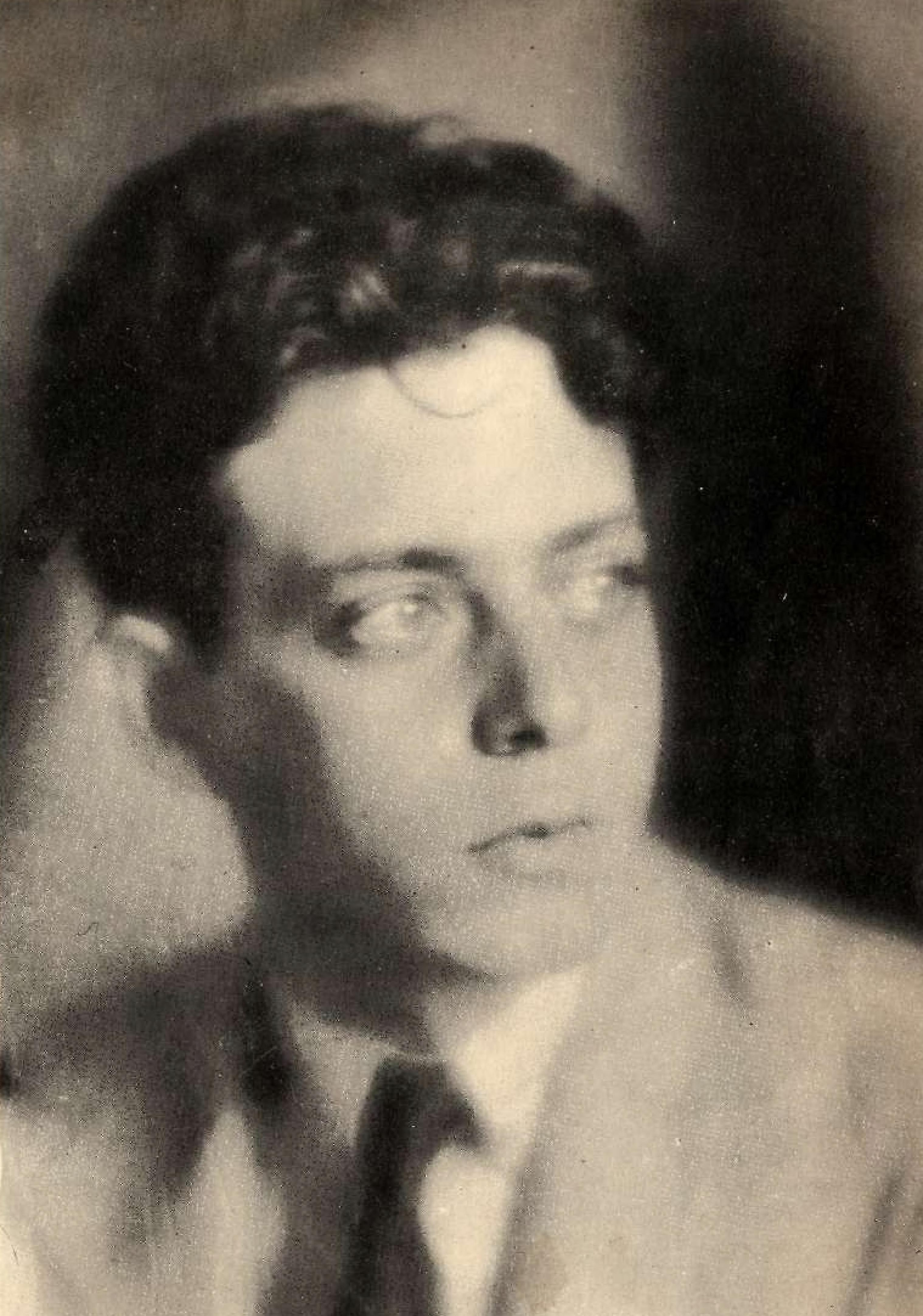

Leader of the Communist Party of Cuba
- In office 1929–1934

Personal details
- Born: December 20, 1899 Alquízar
- Died: January 16, 1934 (Aged 35) La Esperanza Sanatory, Havana
- Cause of death: Tuberculosis
- Resting place: Cementerio Cristóbal Colón
- Education: University of Havana
- Leader of: Protest of the Thirteen; Cuban General Strike of 1933

Rubén Agnelio Martínez Villena (December 20, 1899 – January 16, 1934) was a Cuban writer, lawyer, and revolutionary leader. He was the ringleader of the Protest of the Thirteen, the first protest of the Cuban intellectual class since the country had gained its independence, and signed the "Manifesto of the Group of Thirteen." He was also the founder of the Minorista Group, a group of Cuban intellectuals which was called the "Vanguard of the Intelligentsia." He led the 1933 General Strike which in a small part helped to oust Gerardo Machado from power, and died the following year after a long battle with tuberculosis.

== Biography ==
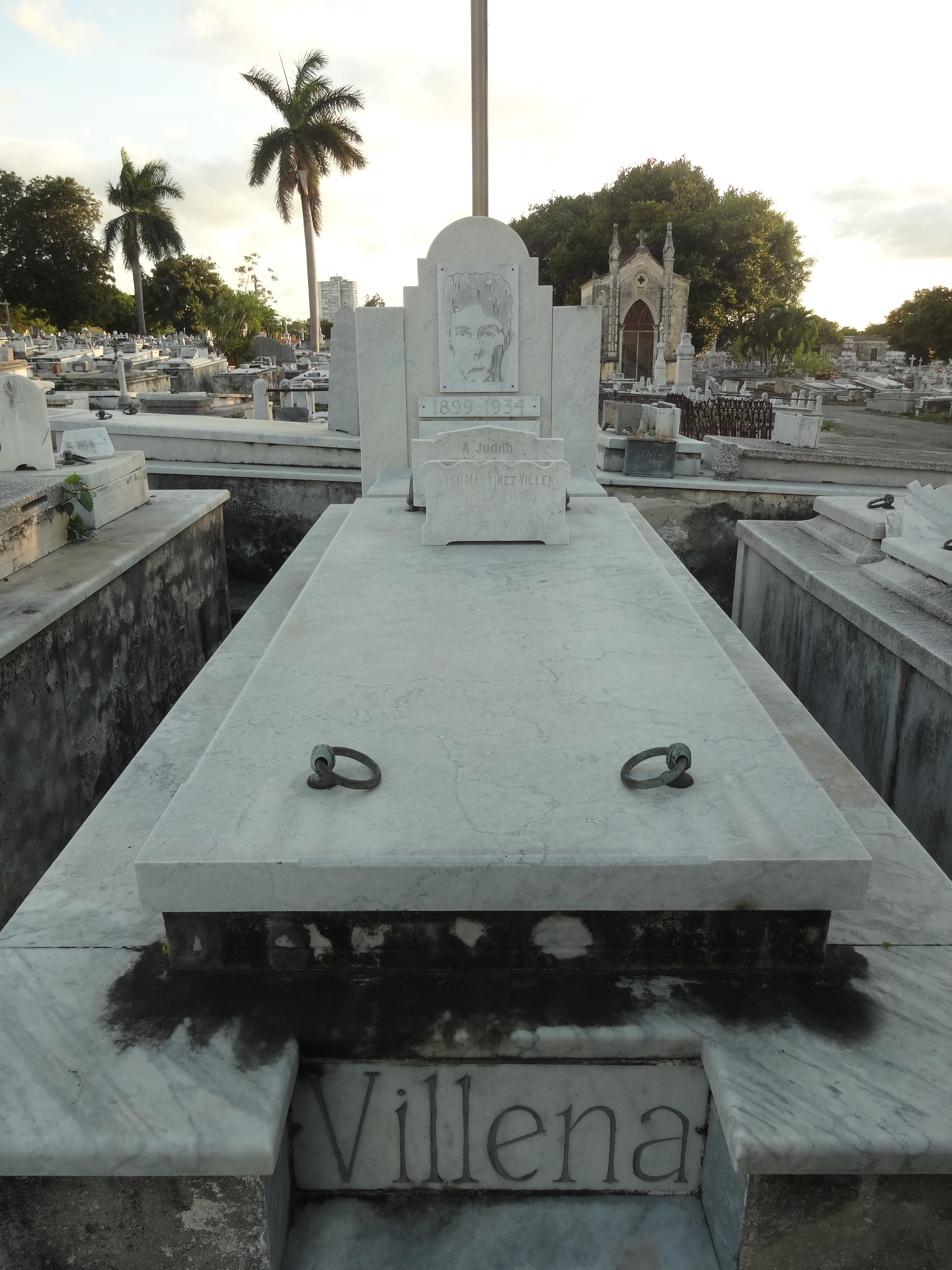
Grave

Villena's mother was María de los Dolores de Jesús Manuel de Villena y Delmonte, his father was Kuciano Agustín Rogelio Martínez Echemendía.

After graduating from the University of Havana Law School in 1922, Villena worked as a lawyer in the offices of Fernando Ortiz Fernández, and published poetry and short stories in newspapers and magazines from 1917 until the late 1920s.

On March 18, 1923, Villena was the leader of the Protest of the Thirteen, denouncing the government of President Alfredo Zayas for corruption and the sale of the Santa Clara Convent. This led to the foundation of the Grupo Minorista, a group of artists and intellectuals who became influential in Cuban culture and politics.

In April 1923, Villena created the Cuban Action Phalange.

After meeting Julio Antonio Mella, founder of the Communist Party of Cuba, he got more involved in the socialist struggle in Cuba, against what was seen at the time as neocolonial governments subdued to the United States interests.

In 1925, while working in the law offices of Fernando Ortiz, he was appointed to the position of Legal Adviser to the National Confederation of Workers of Cuba (CNOC). Villena then represented Julio Mella in his trial for "insulting" President Zayas.

During this time, he contracted Tuberculosis. His life then became a balance between managing his illness and his revolutionary causes.

When Mella died in 1929, Villena absorbed his position as leader of the Communist Party of Cuba. He then organized and led the general strike against Machado in March, 1930.

Facing political persecution, he sought refuge in the United States and later traveled to the Soviet Union in 1930. While still maintaining his position as the leader of the Communist Party of Cuba, he worked in Moscow in the Latin American Section of the KOMITERN. During his time in the USSR, he received medical treatment for tuberculosis and was informed in 1932 that his condition was incurable, prompting his return to Cuba.

Back in his country, he organized and led the 1933 revolutionary general strike that helped to overthrow the dictatorship of Gerardo Machado in August 1933.

He died in Havana on June 16, 1934, in La Esperanza Sanatory. His funeral was attended by over 20,000 people.

A stamp was issued December 20, 1999 by the Postal Authority in Cuba commemorating him as a revolutionary.
