= Alberto Lamar Schweyer =

Cuban journalist, novelist, and essayist

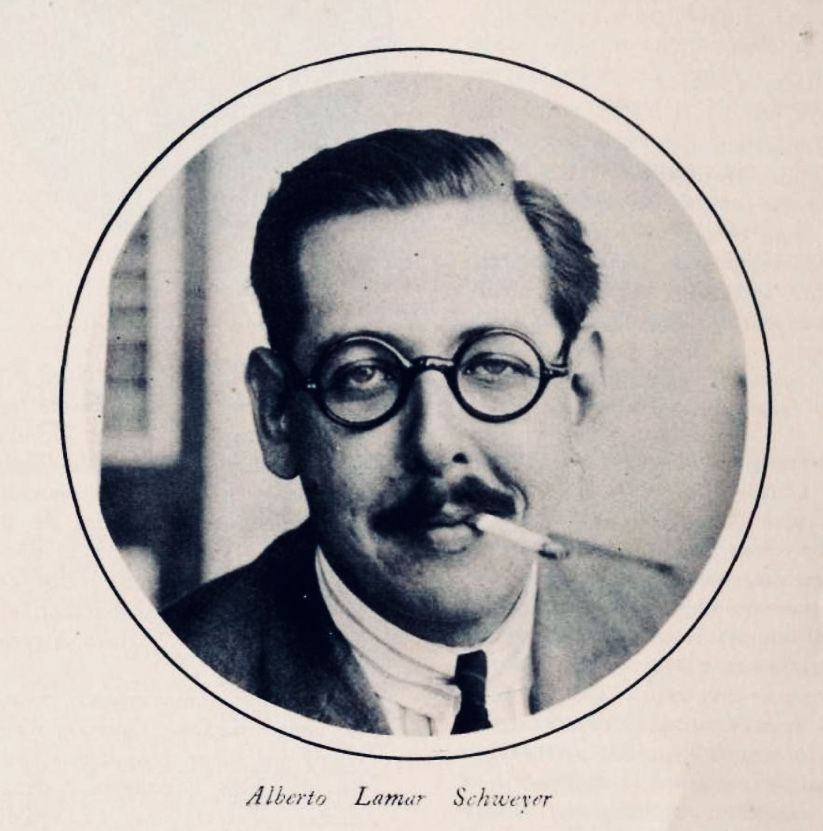

Press Secretary for the President of the Republic of Cuba
- President: Gerardo Machado

Personal details
- Born: July 6, 1902 Matanzas
- Died: August 12, 1942 (aged 40) Havana

Alberto Lamar Schweyer was a Cuban journalist, essayist, and novelist, part of the "Generation of 1930," whose career left a significant imprint on early 20th-century Cuban literature and politics. He worked as a journalist and writer for Heraldo de Cuba, El Sol, Social, Carteles, Smart, Cuba Contemporánea, El País, Diario de la Marina, El Mundo, La Discusión and La Lucha.

In 1918, at only sixteen years old, he joined the editorial team of Heraldo de Cuba. By 1920, he was actively participating in Havana's intellectual circles, notably the gatherings at Café Martí, alongside contemporaries such as Rubén Martínez Villena and Juan Marinello. From 1921, his literary work began in the magazines Social and El Fígaro. In 1922, he was the editor-in-chief of Smart. In 1924 he moved to El Sol, where he eventually became the deputy director.

In 1923, Lamar Schweyer was present for the Protest of the Thirteen, the first significant event of the Cuban intellectual class, and was a signatory to the "Manifesto of the Group of 13." Initially a republican reformist aligned with the Grupo Minorista, a collective advocating for social and cultural reforms, Lamar Schweyer's political stance shifted following Gerardo Machado's rise to power in 1925. Lamar Schweyer served as Machado's Press Secretary. He became an apologist for Machado's regime, leading to his expulsion from the Grupo Minorista. His support for Machado was evident in his writings, including the book "Cómo cayó el Presidente Machado," (English: The Fall of President Machado), where he portrayed Machado as an unselfish patriot.

Lamar Schweyer's literary contributions include essays and novels that reflect his complex ideological positions. His novel "Vendaval en los cañaverales" ("Gale in the Cane Fields") offers a critical perspective on the Cuban aristocracy, intertwining themes of social hierarchy and the sugar industry's impact on Cuban society.

His essays often delved into sociological and philosophical topics, providing insights into the cultural and political dynamics of his time.

== Archived works ==
- "Online Books Page archive". onlinebooks.library.upenn.edu.
- Poeticus archive
- Life Begins Tomorrow
- Vendaval en los cañaverales
