= Joaquín Casillas =

Cuban military personnel (1907–1959)

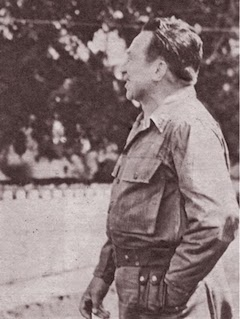
- Born: 24 November 1907; Sancti Spíritus, Santa Clara Province, Republic of Cuba
- Died: 2 January 1959 (aged 51); Santa Clara, Las Villas Province, Republic of Cuba
- Cause of death: Execution by firing squad
- Military career
- Allegiance: Republic of Cuba
- Branch: Cuban Constitutional Army
- Rank: Colonel
- Conflicts: Cuban Revolution; Battle of Santa Clara (executed)

Joaquín Casillas Lumpuy (24 November 1907 – 2 January 1959) was a Cuban military officer and commanding officer in the Cuban Constitutional Army who in 1948 was convicted of murdering the union leader Jesús Menéndez. He was summarily executed after the day of the Triumph of the Revolution.

== Biography ==
Joaquín Casillas became widely known by assassinating the influential sugar union leader and congressman Jesús Menéndez on 22 January 1948, during the presidency of Ramón Grau.

Jesús Menéndez had redoubled union efforts against the government due to the drastic reduction in the percentage of the "sugar differential," a historic labor achievement that kept the price of sugar and wages up to date. The government then ordered his arrest, because of the obvious act of provocation. Menéndez felt that he was able to lead Union demonstrations against the government without fear of retaliation from the government due to the immunity that he enjoyed from his capacity as representative to the Chamber for the Popular Socialist Party.

On 22 January 1948, then Captain Joaquín Casillas boarded the train in Manzanillo, Cuba in which Menéndez was travelling in with the intention of arresting him. Due to his immunity, the union leader rejected the arrest order as illegal and refused to follow the soldier, turning his back to him. Casillas then shot him in the back, killing him. Captain Casillas was tried and found guilty of the murder in case 91 of 1948. The lawyer for the Menéndez family was Carlos Rafael Rodríguez.

Casillas's defence attorney during the case was José Miró Cardona, who between 5 January 5 and 16 February 1959 would be the first prime minister of the Cuban Revolution, and later in Miami, Florida he would be the leader of a Cuban exile committee called the Cuban Revolutionary Council. Soon Casillas was released.

In 1958, during the Cuban Revolution, Colonel Joaquín Casillas received the order from President Fulgencio Batista to defend Santa Clara and stop the 26th of July Movement guerrillas that were advancing on Havana. On 1 January 1959, after the Battle of Santa Clara, Casillas was detained by guerrilla fighters under the command of Che Guevara. He was summarily executed the next day.
