= Revista de Avance =

Avant-garde magazine in Cuba (1927–1930)

- Editor: Alejo Carpentier; José Zacarías Tallet; Martín Casanovas; Francisco Ichaso
- Frequency: Biweekly; Monthly
- Founder: Juan Marinello; Jorge Mañach; Martí Casanovas; Francisco Ichaso; Alejo Carpentier
- Founded: 1927
- First issue: 15 March 1927
- Final issue Number: 15 September 1930; 50
- Country: Cuba
- Based in: Havana
- Language: Spanish
- ISSN: 9964-083X
- OCLC: 960816015

Revista de Avance (Spanish: Advance Magazine) was a Cuban avant-garde magazine which existed between 1927 and 1930 in Havana. It was the media outlet of a group, minorism, which had been established in 1923 to support social and political change in Cuba. The magazine was described by Francine Masiello as "the most handsome product of avant-garde creative activity in Cuba and perhaps in Spanish." It functioned as a platform to gather the leading Cuban artists of the period.

== History and profile ==
Revista de Avance was launched by Cuban artists who were members of the minorism group, including Juan Marinello, Jorge Mañach, Martí Casanovas, Francisco Ichaso and Alejo Carpentier, on 15 March 1927. In the first issue the editors announced the following: "We want movement, change, advancement, even in the magazine's name! And we want absolute independence-even from time!" In line with this statement the format of its title was changed each year. In addition, the year of the publication was also printed in the title as reflection of the progress of the movement over time. The goal of Revista de Avance was to reinforce "the new art in its diverse manifestations" and the "economic independence of Cuba". They opposed the American influence in the country and supported the Latin American unity. The magazine was headquartered in Havana. It was published biweekly until issue 18 and then it came out monthly.

Alejo Carpentier was the editor of the magazine only in the first issue. He was succeeded by José Zacarías Tallet who edited the magazine until issue 27. Martín Casanovas served as co-editor until issue 10. Then Francisco Ichaso edited the magazine. Revista de Avance featured articles in distinct topics and had numerous contributors: Dámaso Alonso, Luis Araquistáin, Ramón Gómez de la Serna, Federico García Lorca, Guillermo de Torre, Ramón del Valle-Inclán, Jorge Luis Borges, Eugenio Florit, Mariano Brull, Waldo Frank, Curzio Malaparte, and Henri Barbusse. The sculptures, lithographs, and paintings by leading artists such as Jean Cocteau, Salvador Dalí, and Henri Matisse were also published in the magazine.

Revista de Avance folded following the publication of the issue 50 dated 15 September 1930. Throughout its lifetime it had a circulation of 3,000 copies.

== See also ==
- List of avant-garde magazines
