= Aracelio Iglesias =

Cuban labor leader and dockworker (1901–1948)

- Iglesias c. 1948
- Born: Aracelio Iglesias Díaz; 22 June 1901; Consolación del Sur, Pinar del Río, Cuba
- Died: 17 October 1948 (aged 47); Havana, Cuba
- Cause of death: Assassination
- Resting place: Colon Cemetery, Havana, Cuba
- Occupations: Labor unionist; Dockworker

Aracelio Iglesias Díaz (22 June 1901 – 17 October 1948) was a Cuban labor leader, labor unionist, and dockworker. He served as general secretary of the dockworkers union in the Port of Havana and was a staunch communist. His assassination in 1948 sparked protests throughout Havana.

== Biography ==
Iglesias was born in 1901 in Consolación del Sur, a rural community in the Pinar del Río province. His father died when he was young, and he had to leave school so he could work and help his family. He moved to Regla with his mother and took on jobs as a day laborer. From the age of 15, he worked at the Port of Havana. He joined the Cuban Communist Party.

In 1933, Iglesias participated in a major general strike that ultimately led to the downfall of the Machado dictatorship. In 1939, he was elected general secretary of the Sindicato de Estibadores y Jornaleros del Puerto (transl. Dockworkers and Day Laborers Union), (Note: Also referred to as the "Sindicato Nacional de Trabajadores Maritimos y Portuarios" (transl. National Union of Maritime and Dockworkers)) and he negotiated wage increases and paid time off for his fellow dockworkers. He introduced rotating lists at the port to ensure that dockworkers had equal opportunity for paid shifts, and he spoke out against mechanized systems for handling cargo at the port, which he said caused some dockworkers to lose their jobs. Under his leadership, the union established a mutual aid fund and built a school and medical clinic for the workers and their families.

Iglesias's critics referred to him as "the Red Czar of the port of Havana" ("zar rojo del puerto de la Habana"), and they claimed that the port was "the most expensive port in the world" ("el puerto más caro del mundo"). His advocacy put him in direct conflict with Carlos Prío Socarrás, who was the Minister of Labor at the time.

== Death ==
On 17 October 1948, a week after Prío ascended to the presidency, Iglesias met fellow trade unionists to plan their next steps. Suddenly, gunmen came in and shot him four times. He died at the hospital the next day. His murderers were later revealed to be "gangsters" acting at the behest of Emilio Surí Castillo, the anti-communist general secretary of the National Federation of Sugar Workers (FNTA). (Note: The previous general secretary of the FNTA was the communist politician Jesús Menéndez.)

Massive protests broke out at Iglesias's funeral, and workers across different industries engaged in "total" work stoppage throughout Havana. His killing was widely condemned in the press, even by newspapers like El Mundo which were opposed to him politically. Iglesias was survived by his four-month-old son, Aracelio Bernardo. He was interred at Colon Cemetery in Havana.

== See also ==
- Jesús Menéndez, politician and leader of the sugar workers union, assassinated in January 1948
- Miguel Fernández Roig, leader of the tobacco workers union, assassinated in April 1948
