= Mariano Brull =

Cuban Symbolist poet and diplomat (1891–1956)

Mariano Brull Caballero (February 24, 1891 – June 8, 1956) was a Cuban poet usually associated with the French Symbolist movement. Two Symbolists who strongly influenced him were Stéphane Mallarmé and Paul Valéry. Among Cuban poets of the first half of the 20th century he was the most outstanding of those who wrote poetry for poetry's sake, as opposed to poetry that addressed social issues or poetry that was inspired by the culture of Cubans of African descent. Because of his interest in the sounds of words, he is known for a type of poetry called "jitanjáfora" in which the words are virtually meaningless, their sounds all-important. A diplomat by profession, he lived many years in various countries of Europe and the Americas.

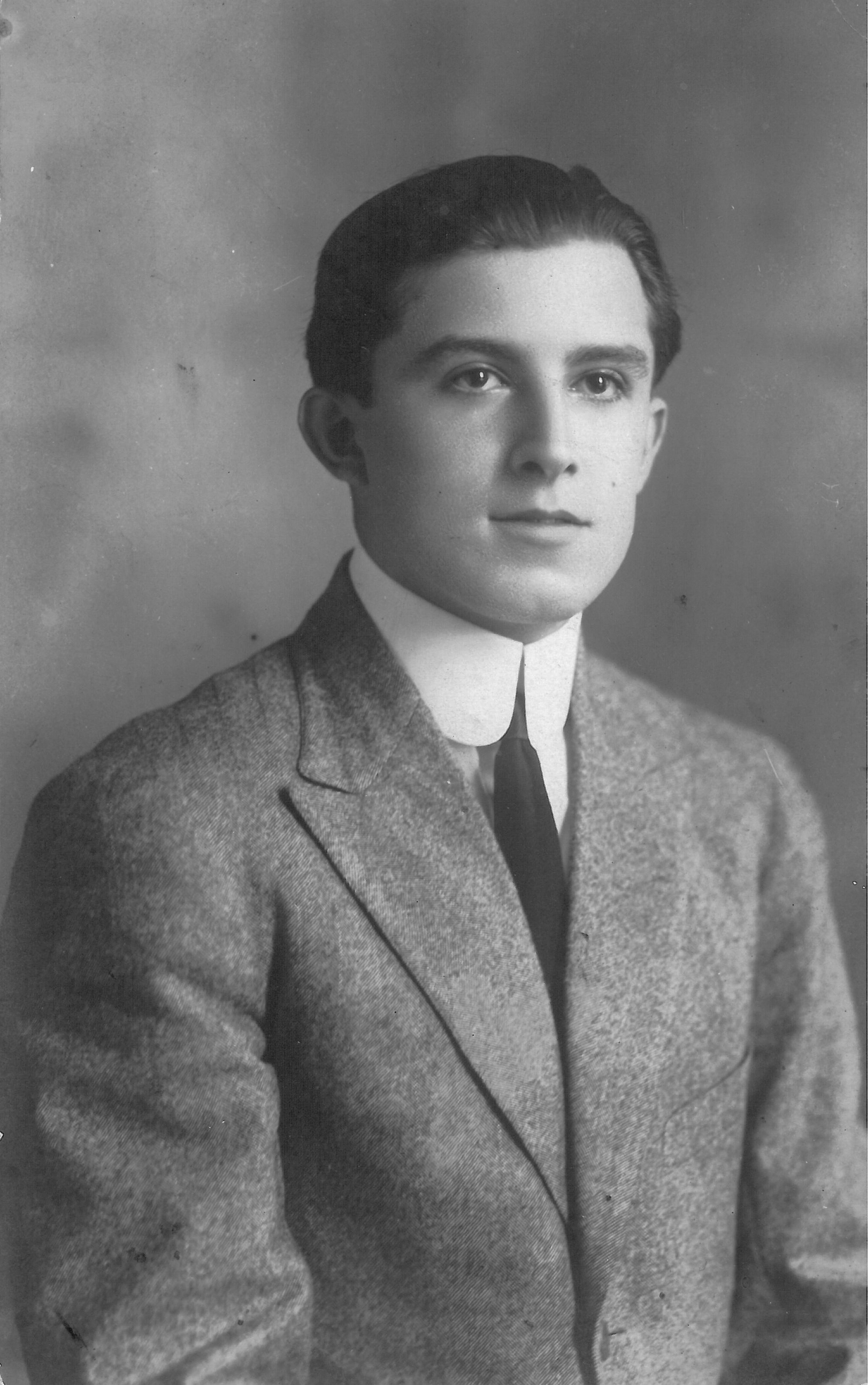
MARIANO BRULL (1891-1956) upon graduation from the University of Havana in 1913

== Biography ==
Brull was born in Camagüey, in eastern Cuba, where his father, Miguel Brull, a Spanish army officer, was stationed. His mother, Celia Caballero, was descended from a family that had resided in Cuba for many generations.

=== Early life ===
As a child he lived in Ceuta and Málaga in Spain. It was during his teenage years, as a student in Camagüey, that he discovered his passion for poetry. He and other students founded a short-lived magazine for which they wrote poems and essays. Eagerly reading all the poetry he could, young Brull was especially struck by the work of the French Symbolist poets.

In 1908 he moved to Havana where he attended the university, graduating with a Doctor of Law degree at age 22. He worked in a law office but also wrote poetry for the magazine El Fígaro. During 1914 and 1915 he was a member of the small group that formed around the Dominican literary critic, Pedro Henríquez Ureña. Henríquez, believing Brull had a future as a poet, became his mentor, introducing him to editors and suggesting he read poets whom Brull was not familiar with.

In 1916 Brull published his first book of poetry, La casa del silencio. Shortly afterwards he married Adela Baralt and, switching careers, entered the Cuban diplomatic service. Brull was determined to leave Cuba where, exhausted by years fighting for independence and preoccupied by problems facing any new country, the arts were confused and anemic, uninterested in the great experiments (Cubism, futurism, etc.) taking place in Europe.

=== Diplomatic life ===
Though impatient to reach Europe, the first two countries he was sent to as a diplomat were the United States and Peru. In the mid 20s he was stationed in Madrid. There he had the good fortune to participate in the reunions of the literary cafés frequented by many of the best poets Spain was to produce in the 20th century: Federico García Lorca, Rafael Alberti, Jorge Guillén, Vicente Aleixandre, and many others. While in Madrid, some of Brull's early poetry was published in Paris in a French translation.

In 1923 Brull joined about 60 young professionals of Havana who decided to take a public stance against the reigning passivity and mediocrity in politics and culture. Called El Grupo Minorista (the Minority Group), they demanded an end to years of cultural backwardness and an aggressive affirmation of the new artistic tendencies coming out of Europe. In politics, they denounced dictatorships and called for the formation of a Cuban government more responsive to the people.

In 1928 he published his second book of poetry, Poemas en menguante. Though also published in Paris, where he was now living, it was written in Spanish. All of his books were small editions for friends and family, paid for out of his pocket.

The Brulls lived in Paris from 1927 to 1934 with only two interruptions: a year, each, in Berne and Havana. The return of the Brulls to Havana coincided with numerous riots and demonstrations as students clashed with the police of the government of President Gerardo Machado, an increasingly ruthless dictator.

Brull spent the Great Depression back in Paris. Two or three times a year found him traveling. He frequently visited Havana, on business; southern Spain, the land of his childhood; and Mexico City where he called on his friends Gabriela Mistral, the Chilean poet, Alfonso Reyes, the Mexican man-of-letters, and others.

In 1934 his third book of poetry, Canto redondo, was brought out in Paris. He was stationed in Rome between 1934 and 1937 where fascism was alive and thriving.

After moving to Brussels (for the second time) at the end of the 1930s, Brull was in charge of attending to the many German Jews who, seeking visas to emigrate, had lined up before the legations and embassies of numerous countries. During these years he was Cuba's delegate to the XVII Reunion of the Assembly of the League of Nations and, also, Commissioner for the repatriation of Cubans fleeing the Spanish Civil War. Brull had decided that an all-European war was imminent—though most of his colleagues and friends disagreed—and pressured the Ministry to be sent back to Havana. He left in June, 1939. The ship carrying all of the Brull's household effects to Cuba, a year later, was torpedoed by the Germans and sank.

In 1939, a bilingual (French-Spanish) book, Poëmes, came out in Paris, with a preface written by one of the greatest literary figures of France at the time, Paul Valéry. Brull worked for many years on a translation into Spanish of Valéry's most famous, and difficult, poems: "Le Cimetiére Marin" (The Graveyard by the Sea) and "La Jeune Parque" (The Young Fate).

In Cuba, Brull was one of the principal organizers of a conference of the International Institute of Intellectual Cooperation, held in 1941. This organization was made up of major intellectuals who believed that the interchange of ideas would help lead to a solution to the tension of the 1930s and the violence of the Second World War. Brull admired people who were capable of both action and thought. He had no use for the static attitude of Rodin´s famous statue, "The Thinker". Brull's hero was the Cuban journalist and poet, José Martí, who was responsible for organizing the Cuban resistance to Spain and died in a skirmish with Spanish soldiers during the War of Independence.

His fifth book of poetry, Solo de rosa, appeared. His poems also were printed in the foremost literary publications: Social, Gaceta del Caribe, Espuela de Plata, Clavileño, Orígenes and El Fígaro. He had long conversations with the exiled Spanish poet, Juan Ramón Jiménez, who wrote a similar type of poetry.

During the Second World War, Brull was stationed in Washington, D.C., and in 1945 was sent to Ottawa to establish the first Cuban diplomatic mission in Canada.

In Brussels, once more, in 1950, he published Temps en peine. Tiempo en pena, a bilingual edition. Here, too, his wife died after many years of fighting cancer.

His last post was as Cuban ambassador to Uruguay. However, he refused to comply with an order from the Cuban dictator, Fulgencio Batista, and he resigned abruptly, ending a career of 47 years in the Cuban diplomatic service. That same year (1954) the final book of poems he would publish, Rien que... (Nada más que...), came out in Paris.

=== Final years ===
Back in Havana, he turned to modernizing the cattle ranch he had inherited from his mother. But a growing brain tumor weakened him bit by bit and eventually left him in a coma. He died at the age of 65 in 1956.

== Literary characteristics ==
=== Beginnings ===
Brull's first book, La casa del silencio, is a good example of Hispanic modernismo, though it has its share of intimate, Symbolist influence and a touch of tropical romanticism. Already one finds themes that would stay with him always: the ideal of beauty and the exploration of the interior world of one's heart as an escape from the ungrateful reality of the world, of time and of history.

Evident is the influence of the Spaniard, Juan Ramón Jiménez, and the Mexican, Enrique González Martínez. But these poems are the works of an apprentice. Nine years pass between the publication of his first and second collections of poetry, years in which he matured, especially after he arrived in Europe.

In his second book, Poemas en menguante, Brull embraces Symbolism (pure poetry) though the poems show him still struggling to assimilate the new style completely. He finds himself immersed in the heated discussion of the poets of his generation as to whether Symbolism, art as pure abstraction, meant the dehumanization of art. Brull made clear that poetry was the purification of thought and form, but never abstraction. Nevertheless, Symbolism and dehumanization were firmly linked in the minds of many. Harsh criticism of Symbolism was heard frequently, including in Cuba.

=== Sound ===
A cornerstone of Brull's poetry is the word as sound material. This interest in sound can be found in the efforts of Mallarmé and Valéry to achieve pure poetry but also in the neo-popular romances of the Spanish poetic tradition—a source that attracted other poets writing in Spanish, most famously García Lorca. Similar experiments involving playing with the sounds of words were to be found in Italian, German and English literature of the 1920s and before.

Brull's creativity involving the use of sounds, through tongue-twisters and various phonetic experiments, could create a world of “magical enchantment.” These sounds and lexicological permutations combined, at times, to reach a level of senselessness which resulted in poetry that has come to be known as “jitanjáfora” after the use of this word in Brull's poem “Filiflama…”, a poem entirely made up of invented words.

Filiflama alabe cundre
ala olalúnea alífera
alveola jitanjáfora
liris salumba salífera.

Olivia oleo olorife
alalai cánfora sandra
milingítara girófora
zumbra ulalindre calandra.

Yet such an extreme interest in sound was but one strand in Brull's poetry. The “jitanjáfora” was “a verbal joke, created by Brull at the margin of the main body of his work, but as an extreme consequence of this work’s development”.

=== Childhood ===
Brull revealed an interest in childhood in a number of his poems through the subject matter or through the use of language and rhythms associated with children's verses or both. The verses he learned in southern Spain, as a boy, had a lasting impact on him. These verses were part of the traditional, popular poetry that was so appreciated by his generation of poets.

=== Typical features ===
Though he used alliteration and metaphors abundantly, there are features of his work that differentiate it from the work of others. These include:

- rare word associations
- using a word twice in the same line but in totally different ways
- punning
- combining or coupling words that mean the opposite or clash in their meanings (“the melody of the perfume”), usually placed within dashes, and
- illogical sound games and onomatopoeia where one sees the influence of futurism and Dadaism.

Brull favored free verse, followed by blank verse, though he occasionally turned to the sonnet and other poetic forms. His poems are usually short, and the total number of poems he wrote was rather limited, both rare attributes in comparison with most Hispanic poets.

=== The rose ===
The rose is the principal motif in Brull's poetry, his preferred symbol for “a standard of perfection and permanence in a transitory world.”

Mallarmé had defined a flower as the absence of the stem and leaves, his way of stating that the finality of art is the concentration on the essence. No other Cuban poet went as far as Brull in immersing himself in this conception of poetry. But his Latin American origin do not allow him to forget the stems and leaves altogether. Brull's contribution to the poetry of Cuba is this counterpoint between the concrete and the ideal.

An equilibrium between the sensual and the abstract is most fully reached in Solo de rosas, a collection of poems in which the poet praises the rose in its pure essence, fragile and wondrous, and not corrupted by the passage of time.

Epitafio de la Rosa (Epitaph For a Rose)

Rompo una rosa y no te encuentro.
Al viento, así, columnas deshojadas,
palacio de la rosa en ruinas.
Ahora—rosa imposible—empiezas:
por agujas de aire entretejida
al mar de la delicia intacta,
donde todas las rosas
--antes que rosa—
belleza son sin cárcel de belleza.

(I take apart a rose and I don't find you.
To the wind, thus, columns of floating petals,
the palace of the rose in ruins.
Now—impossible rose—you begin:
by needles of interwoven air
to the sea of the intact delight,
where all the roses of the world
--before they were a rose—
are beautiful without the prison of beauty.)

=== Nothingness ===
In his last works, Tiempo en pena and Nada más que…, Brull's poetry takes on a melancholy, somber and reflective tone, that of a journey toward the black hole of existentialism, possibly intensified by personal tragedy (the death of his wife) and the world around him seemingly falling apart (the Spanish Civil War followed by the Second World War).

Throughout the years one can find, beneath the formal and expressive clarity, Brull's increasing concern of what he saw as a world in permanent deterioration. The roots of this desolation are evident in his first poems in which absence and silence—often depicted as quietness—are present yet any discomfort is dispelled by the vision of ideal beauty. By the 1950s, absence is no longer a friendly notion as it veers into nothingness. Brull is consumed by a tragic vision of life in which all things, including beauty, are conceived of as subject to destruction or, a word he often chose, ruin. Once time has done its task, only nothingness remains. “Never had Cuban poetry reached so far into desperation with such discreteness and solitude.”

== Quotes ==
"La prosa es escrita con el tesoro del conocimiento mientras que la poesía es escrita con el tesoro de la ignorancia."

“Prose is written with the treasure of knowledge whereas poetry is written with the treasure of ignorance.”

== Books of poetry ==
- La casa del silencio (1916)
- Poemas en menguante (1928)
- Canto redondo (1934)
- Poëmes (1939) (Bilingual anthology: Spanish-French)
- Solo de rosa (1941)
- Temps en peine/Tiempo en pena (1950)
- Rien que ... (Nada más que ...) (1954)

== Further reading (sources not mentioned in references) ==
- Gastón Baquero. Mariano Brull. La casa del silencio (Antología de su obra:1916-1954) (1976).
- Diego García Elio. Una antología de poesía cubana (1984).
- Ricardo Larraga. Mariano Brull y la poesía pura en Cuba (1994).
