= José Manuel Casanova Diviño =

Cuban sugar mill owner and politician (died 1949)

José Manuel Casanova
- Born: José Manuel Casanova Diviñó; 1884; Bahía Honda, Pinar del Río Province, Cuba
- Died: December 22, 1949
- Occupations: Sugar mill owner, politician
- Known for: President of the Asociación Nacional de Hacendados de Cuba and the Instituto Cubano de Estabilización del Azúcar
- Children: José Manuel Casanova de Soto

Banknote-style printed paper promoting Casanova for Senate, 1948

José Manuel Casanova Diviñó (1884 – 22 December 1949) was a Cuban sugar mill owner and Liberal politician. He presided over the Asociación Nacional de Hacendados de Cuba (National Association of Sugar Mill Owners) during the 1930s and 1940s, and as president of the Instituto Cubano de Estabilización del Azúcar (ICEA, Cuban Sugar Stabilization Institute) he was one of the mill owners' representatives in the negotiations under which the United States bought Cuba's sugar crops during and after the Second World War. He was a delegate to the Constitutional Convention of 1940, sat in the Senate of Cuba in the 1940s, and led the Liberal Party organization in Pinar del Río Province at the time of the 1948 general election. The saying "Sin azúcar no hay país" ("Without sugar there is no country") is attributed to him.

== Central Orozco ==
Casanova had worked at the Central Orozco sugar mill, near Cabañas in Pinar del Río Province, before buying it in 1928. In 1943 the mill was operated by the Compañía Central Orozco, which was registered at the same Havana address Casanova used for his own business.

== Sugar industry ==
Casanova was president of the ICEA by late 1939. When the United States restored Cuba's tariff preference at the end of that year, he publicly urged American refiners and brokers to pay the duties on Cuban sugar held in bond before the year ended, so that it would not count against Cuba's 1940 quota. In 1941 he was still president of the institute and, according to the United States ambassador George S. Messersmith, was one of very few mill owners in the Cuban Congress; Messersmith described him as generally helpful in the negotiations over that year's sugar financing arrangement, but difficult on the question of molasses.

From 1942 the United States bought Cuba's entire sugar crop each year under negotiated contracts. Casanova and Arturo Mañas represented the mill owners on the Cuban commission for the sale of the 1942 crop, which was led by the minister Amadeo López Castro and also included representatives of the cane growers (colonos); the same commission negotiated the 1943 sale. Casanova and Mañas again represented the mill owners in the talks over the 1945 crop. On 26 April 1945 Casanova, identified as president of the Sugar Stabilization Institute, was among the Cuban signatories of the contracts with the Commodity Credit Corporation and the Defense Supplies Corporation for the 1945 crop of sugar, blackstrap molasses and industrial alcohol. In July 1946, by then a senator, he took part in the meetings of the Sugar Institute during the dispute in which Cuba suspended sugar shipments to the United States pending a new contract. In early 1947, speaking for Cuba, he advised against an early reopening of the New York Coffee and Sugar Exchange until American rationing and price controls had been settled, warning that it could set off a sudden price rise.

== Political career ==
Casanova was a Liberal delegate to the 1940 Constitutional Convention. He sat in the sections on labour and property and on economic affairs and public finance, and was one of the Liberal members of the convention's Coordinating Committee. On 8 May 1940 he proposed an additional article prohibiting political or social organizations that required obedience to authorities other than those of the Republic, or that were connected to foreign or international organizations. Blas Roca of the Communist Party treated the proposal as an attempt to outlaw his party. Casanova defended the amendment as a liberal and nationalist measure, but later withdrew it in favour of a version proposed by Aurelio Álvarez de la Vega, which passed by one vote and became the basis of Article 37 of the constitution, declaring unlawful political organizations contrary to representative democratic government or to national sovereignty.

He sat in the Senate during the 1940s and was a senator by 1946. During the 1948 campaign he was one of the heads of the Liberal machine in Pinar del Río, together with Benítez and Garriga, and said that he had recently spent $457,000 on the party. After the Liberal–Democratic coalition was defeated, he said publicly that the Auténtico campaign linking its candidate, Ricardo Núñez Portuondo, to the former dictator Gerardo Machado had been fatal to it. In early 1949, as a senator, he joined Prime Minister Manuel Antonio de Varona and President Carlos Prío Socarrás in welcoming American investment in Cuban ports, warehouses, hotels and other infrastructure.

== Death and legacy ==
Casanova died on 22 December 1949. His son, José Manuel Casanova de Soto, inherited Central Orozco and kept it until 1960, when the mill, then operated by the Compañía Azucarera Bramales, was expropriated under Law 890 and renamed Central Pablo de la Torriente Brau. Law 890 of 15 October 1960 nationalized the remaining large companies owned by Cuban nationals. The mill was dismantled in 2002.

The phrase "Sin azúcar no hay país", attributed to Casanova, became a common way of describing sugar's central place in the Cuban economy. The historian Antonio Santamaría García used it as the title of his 2001 study of the Cuban sugar industry between 1919 and 1939.
