= Juan Marinello =

Cuban art critic, poet and politician (1898–1977)

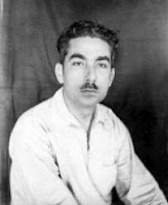
- Marinello in 1940
- Born: Juan Marinello Vidaurreta; 2 November 1898; Villa Clara Province, Captaincy General of Cuba, Spanish Empire
- Died: 27 March 1977 (aged 78); Havana, Cuba
- Education: University of Havana
- Occupations: Poet, essayist, politician
- Writing career
- Notable awards: Order of the October Revolution

Juan Marinello Vidaurreta (2 November 1898 – 27 March 1977) was a Cuban Communist intellectual, writer, poet essayist, lawyer and politician. He was one of the most prominent Cuban intellectual figures of the interwar period and post revolutionary Cuba.

== Biography ==
Marinello was born to a Spanish father and Cuban mother.

He went to Spain as a child and studied in Villafranca del Panadés (Catalonia), his father's homeland, until he was sixteen, when the family returned to Cuba. He first studied in the city of Santa Clara. Later, he completed his higher studies at the University of Havana. He graduated with a Doctorate in Civil Law, a Doctorate in Public Law, and in Philosophy and Letters. Later, he returned to Spain with a scholarship to get a doctorate at the Central University of Madrid, in Spain.

A close friend of the prominent Cuban intellectual Dr. Jorge Mañach during their youth, in later years they irremediably distanced themselves due to political issues. This happened because, during the 1930s, Marinello was linked to the Communist Party of Cuba and later joined it, while Mañach, of aristocratic origin, was always anti-communist.

Together with Rubén Martínez Villena, he founded the magazine Venezuela Libre, at the same time that he began intense political activity, clearly anti-imperialist, which led him into exile on several occasions. He also participated in the founding of the Instituto Hispano Cubano de Cultura (1926) and the Revista de Avance (1927), the latter year in which he published Liberación, his best book of poems.

Exiled in Mexico, Juan Marinello worked as a university professor in addition to collaborating in various publications politically committed to the left. He returned to the island after the fall of the dictatorship of Gerardo Machado, although he was soon removed from his chair again for appearing as director of the proletarian newspaper La Word, founded by the Communist Party of Cuba. Back in Mexico, in 1936 and 1937, he wrote controversial articles about the Spanish Civil War.

Together with Nicolás Guillén, Marinello traveled to Spain in 1937 during the Civil War to attend the Congress of Writers for the Defense of Culture in Madrid and Valencia. He returned to Cuba and became a prominent leader of the Popular Socialist Party. The party supported the first government of Fulgencio Batista during the Second World War and Marinello became a member of Batista's cabinet.

After the banning of the PSP, Marinello was arrested on several occasions under the dictatorship of Fulgencio Batista. After the victory of the Cuban Revolution led by Fidel Castro and Che Guevara he was appointed rector of the University of Havana in 1962, and from there he promoted the University Reform policy.

He collaborated in different literary publications, both on the island and abroad (Soviet Union, France, Costa Rica, Venezuela, Mexico, United States, among others) and held various positions as representative of his country before UNESCO. He held important positions in the Cuban government and was a member of the Central Committee of the Party until his death, due to natural causes, on 27 March 1977, at the age of 78.

== Works ==
Marinello specialized in the work and journalism of José Martí, he left pages on "the apostle" that are considered definitive: Actualidad de Martí. Master of unity (1942), José Martí, American writer: Martí and Modernism (1961), Eleven Martian essays (1965) or Major Poetry of Martí (1973), among other studies and conferences.

Politically committed and anti-imperialist poet, Marinello nevertheless conceived poems of high metaphysical significance. As for his essays, in addition to his Martinian studies, it is worth highlighting Youth and Old Age (1928), Americanism and Literary Cubanism (1932), Spanish Moment (1939), On Cuban Restlessness and Picasso Without Time (1942) or Contemporary (1965).
