= Carlos Loveira =

Cuban journalist and author

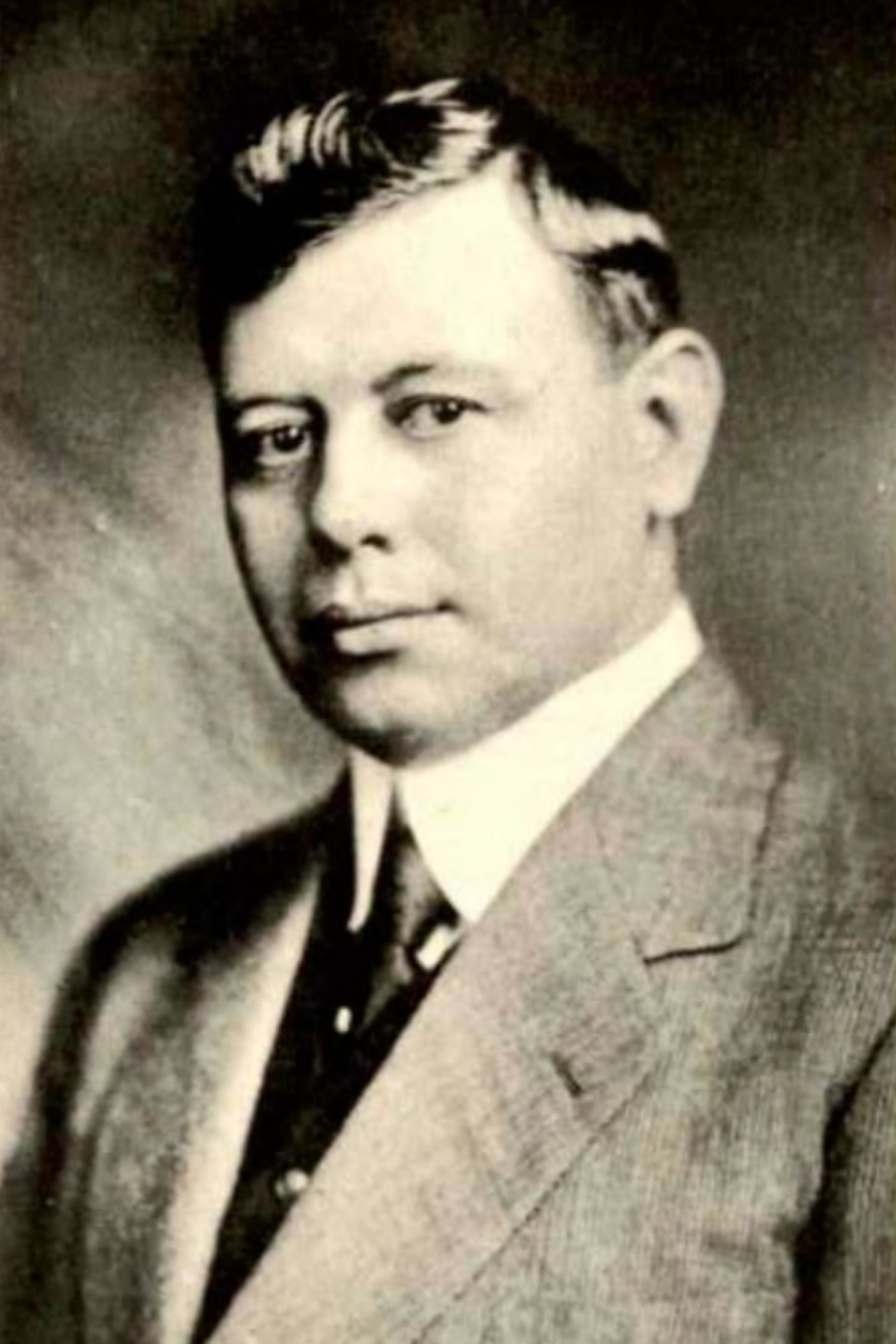
- Born: 1882; Santa Clara
- Died: 1928 (aged 45–46)
- Occupations: Journalist, writer

Carlos Loveira (1882–1928) was a Cuban journalist and naturalistic author.

== Biography ==
Carlos Loveira was a journalist and naturalistic author born in Santa Clara, Cuba. Loveira was orphaned at age nine and moved to New York with his mother's family in 1895. He returned to Cuba in 1898 to fight for the country's independence from Spain, and worked as an interpreter for American troops stationed in Cuba during the U.S. occupation.

An anarchist, Loveira was heavily involved in the Cuban socialist and labor movements. After working in the railroad industry throughout Latin America from 1903, he founded the Liga Cubana de Empleados de Ferrocarriles in 1910 and the newspaper El Ferrocarrilero (1909–1911). He moved from Camagüey to Sagua La Grande after the union failed. Loveira also founded the short-lived newspaper Gente Nueva and the magazine Cauterios.

Exiled to Mexico in 1913, the author spent the remainder of his life traveling between Mexico, Cuba and the United States working as a labor organizer and lobbyist consulting with the United Nations.

His novels include Los inmorales (1910), Generales y doctores (1920), Los ciegos (1922), La última lección (1924) and Juan Criollo (1927).

== Works or Publications ==
- Adrián del Valle: escritor y periodista de Cuba, OCLC 629302
- De los 26 a los 35 lecciones de la experiencia en la lucha obrera, 1908-1917, OCLC 20874848
- El movimiento obrero de los Estados Unidos, OCLC 21732997
- El obrerismo yucateco y la revolución mexicana, OCLC 20532933
- El socialismo en Yucatán; estudio informativo y someramente crítico, base de observación directa de los hechos, OCLC 20559910
- Loveira, Carlos (2011), Fantoches 1926 : folletín moderno por once escritores cubanos, ISBN 9781934768433, OCLC 730253590
- Generales y doctores, OCLC 1145708
- Generaly I Doktora; Khuan Kreol, OCLC 15542633
- Juan Criollo, OCLC 575339
- La Última Lección : Novela, OCLC 651304474
- Los Ciegos, OCLC 1591307
- Loveira, Carlos (1919), Los Inmorales : (novela), OCLC 3527756
- Los Inmorales, OCLC 912536952
- Un Gran Ensavista Cubano: Fernando Lles. Discurso de ingreso ... leído por ... Carlos Loveira y Chirino ... Ia noche del 30 de Enero de 1926. Divagaciones sobre la novela, discurso de contestación por ... Ramón A. Catalá, 1926, OCLC 561145481
- Un gran ensayista cubano : Fernando Lles, discurso... por el señor Carlos Loveira y Chirino,... Divagaciones sobre la novela, discurso de contestación por el Dr. Ramon A. Catala, OCLC 457667236
- Un gran ensayista cubano, Fernando Lles : discurso de ingreso como miembro de número de la Sección de literatura, OCLC 5456194
