= Roig =

Roig (Catalan pronunciation: [ˈrɔtʃ]) is a Catalan surname. It is derived from the word roig, meaning "red", used to describe someone with red hair or a ruddy complexion. It may refer to:

== People ==
- Alex Soler-Roig, former F1 driver from Spain
- Arturo Andrés Roig, Argentine philosopher
- Juan Roig Alfonso (1949), Spanish businessman, president of the Spanish supermarket chain Mercadona
- Juan Ramón Epitié-Dyowe Roig, commonly known as just Juan Epitié, Equatorial Guinea international footballer, born in Spain
- Jorge Larena-Avellaneda Roig, Spanish footballer born in Canary Islands
- Joan Rigol i Roig, Catalan-Spanish politician
- Pablo Sicilia Roig, Spanish footballer born in Canary Islands
- Rubén Epitié-Dyowe Roig, commonly known as Rubén Epitié, Equatorial Guinea international footballer, born in Spain
- Susana Barrientos Roig, Miss Bolivia 1998 and representative of Bolivia at Miss Universe 1999

== See also ==
- Lifson–Roig model
- Rio (disambiguation)
- Ríos (disambiguation)
- Rojo, Castilian (Spanish) form (masculine, singular)
- Rojas, Castilian (Spanish) form (feminine, plural)

== Other meanings ==
- ROIG is the ICAO code of Ishigaki Airport (1943).
