= Revista de la Habana =

Cuban literary magazine

Revista de la Habana (1853-1857) was a Spanish language literary magazine produced in Havana, Cuba. Quintiliano Garcia and Rafael María de Mendive founded and edited it.
