= Revista Cubana =

Cuban magazine

Revista Cubana was a Cuban magazine published from 1877 to 1895.
