= Cuba Contemporánea =

Defunct Cuban magazine (1913–1927)

Inside cover of Cuba Contemporánea, 1913

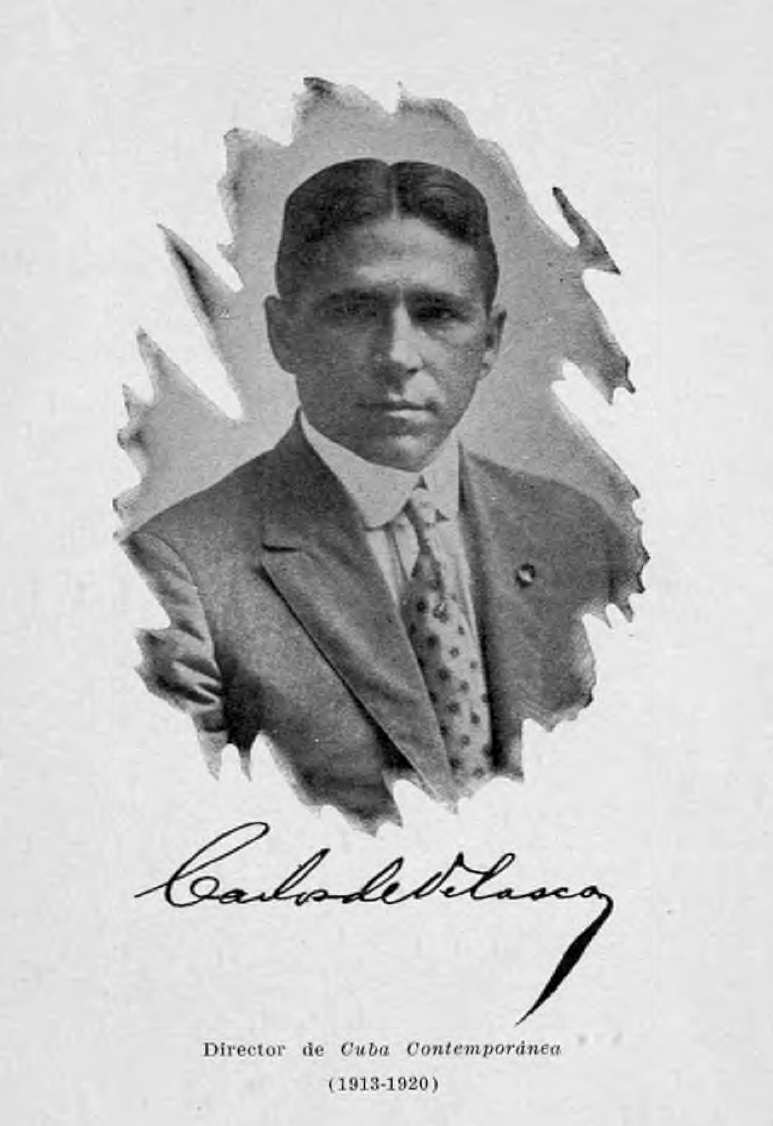
Carlos de Velasco y Pérez, first director of Cuba Contemporánea

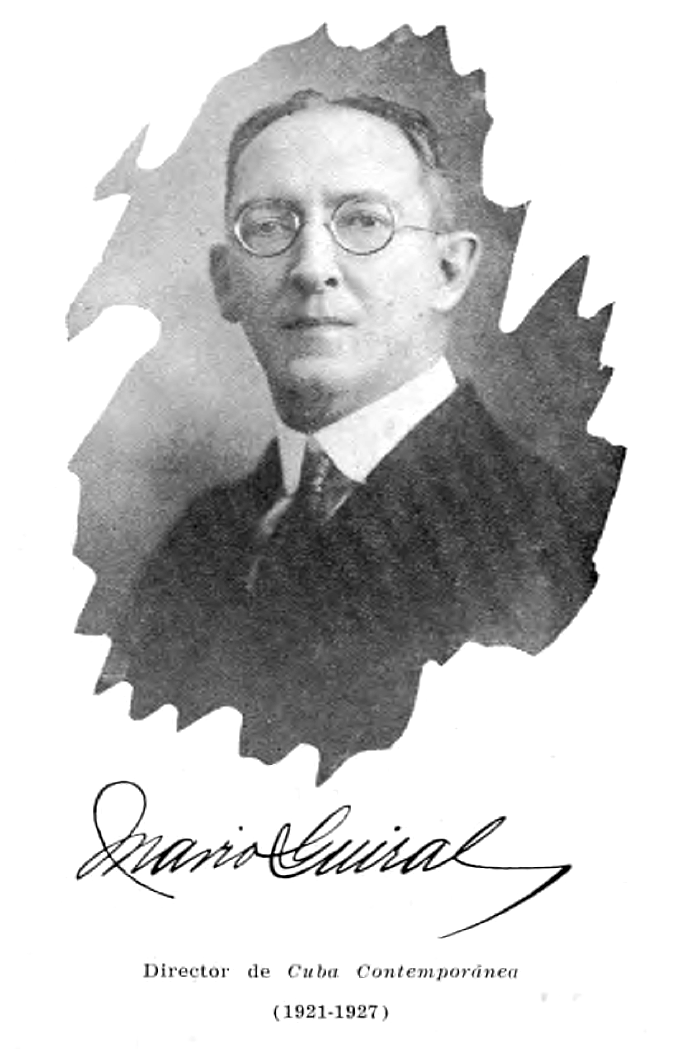
Mario Guiral Moreno, second director of Cuba Contemporánea

Cuba Contemporánea was a Cuban magazine published monthly in Havana from January 1913 to August 1927, and has been described as "the first great magazine of Cuban thought in the 20th century," achieving significant international prestige despite facing censorship and opposition within the island. It was founded and written by prominent members of the "first generation of the Cuban Republic" – a group of independent and liberal intellectuals who emerged following Cuba's independence in 1902. The magazine sought to emulate earlier publications such as Revista de Cuba and Revista Cubana. The magazine's mission was to provide an open platform for modern thought, particularly encouraging Cuban literary and intellectual production, bibliographic studies, and historical analysis – especially regarding Cuba, the Spanish-speaking world, and the broader Americas. Antonio Checa Godoy described it as the most significant and enduring publication of its time. Each issue varied in length, typically between 100 and 200 pages, and every four issues formed a volume, complete with indexes of topics and authors. The full collection comprised 44 volumes, with the final issue published between June and August 1927.

== History ==
Cuba Contemporánea was conceived in 1909 by a group of intellectuals at the Ateneo de La Habana, initially as a magazine focused on urban aesthetics. The journalists present at that original meeting were Julio Villoldo, Cristino F. Cowan, Fermín Peraza Sarusa, and Luis Marino Pérez. By 1911, the vision had expanded to include broader intellectual and cultural discussions. The final plan was formalized in August 1912, and the magazine was officially launched on January 1, 1913. The founding members – Carlos de Velasco, Julio Villoldo, José Sixto de Sola, Mario Guiral Moreno, Ricardo Sarabasa, and Max Henríquez Ureña – funded the publication themselves, maintaining financial independence from external influences.

During its early years, the magazine quickly established itself as a major platform for Cuban and Latin American intellectual discourse. It covered a wide range of topics, including history, politics, sociology, literature, and international affairs. The death of co-founder José Sixto de Sola in 1916 was a major blow, but the magazine continued to grow, strengthening its editorial team with new contributors. In 1918, the Sociedad Editorial Cuba Contemporánea was created to ensure the magazine's financial sustainability. That same year, the group purchased the El Siglo XX printing press for $30,000, securing full control over its production.

Between 1919 and 1923, the magazine reached its peak in influence. A new generation of intellectuals, including Dulce María Borrero, Francisco G. del Valle, and Enrique Gay Calbó, joined the editorial team. In 1920, founding director Carlos de Velasco left for a diplomatic post, and Mario Guiral Moreno took over leadership. By 1923, historian Emilio Roig de Leuchsenring had joined the magazine, adding to its nationalist discourse. The publication gained praise from leading Cuban intellectuals, including Enrique José Varona, who saw it as a major force in shaping Cuban thought.

Velasco died in 1923, striking another blow to the magazine.

From 1923 onward, Cuba Contemporánea began to experience difficulties. Internal disagreements led to the resignations of key figures such as Juan C. Zamora and Ernesto Dihigo. The magazine saw temporary leadership changes in 1925 and 1926, with Julio Villoldo serving as interim director at various points. Financial struggles, along with a changing political and cultural landscape, made it increasingly difficult to sustain operations. By August 1927, after 44 published volumes, the magazine was forced to suspend publication indefinitely.

Despite its closure, Cuba Contemporánea left a lasting legacy as one of Cuba's most important intellectual publications. It provided a platform for both emerging and established thinkers, resisting external pressures and maintaining a high standard of discourse. Historian Emilio Roig de Leuchsenring later described it as a “herald of nationalism and a defender of liberty and justice.”

== Online archives ==
- Digital Library of the Caribbean
- HathiTrust
- Ibero-American Institute
- National Library of Spain
