= José Antonio Fernández de Castro =

Cuban journalist and writer

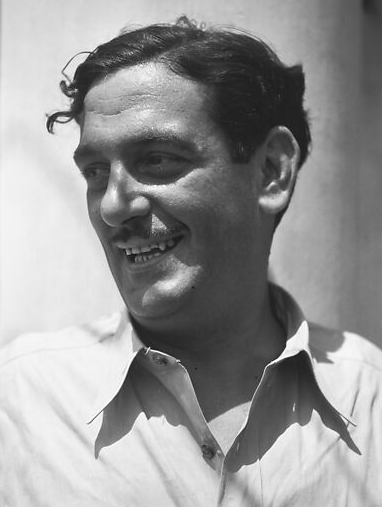
José Antonio Fernández de Castro was a Cuban journalist, writer, and diplomat

José Antonio Fernández de Castro (January 18, 1887 in Havana – July 30, 1951 in Havana) was a Cuban journalist and writer active in the first part of the 20th century. He was a member of the Minorista Group, the Veterans and Patriots Movement, and participated in the Protest of the Thirteen. Every year, Cuba hosts a national journalism competition called the "José Antonio Fernández de Castro Journalism Award."

In 1917 he graduated with a doctorate in civil law degree from the University of Havana. Long interested in journalism and historical investigation, he worked with the newspapers El Fígaro and La Nación. He directed the literary section of Diario de la Marina from 1927 to 1929, using it as a platform to support the contemporary Spanish avant-garde literary movements, often called the vanguardia.

He collaborated on a number of anti-imperialist publications such as Venezuela Libre and América Libre, and later became involved in Communist activities. He was, for example, one of the first Cuban writers to study the poetry of the October Revolution. He served as a diplomat between 1934 and 1944.

His most important works include a compilation of the letters of José Antonio Saco, published under the title Medio siglo de historia colonial de Cuba (1923). In addition, he published the anthology La poesía moderna en Cuba (1926) and a collection of his best journalism En Barraca de feria (1933).

He died on July 30, 1951, in his native Havana.
