= CMQ (Cuba) =

Pre-1959 Cuban radio and television station

CMQ Televisión (CMQ)
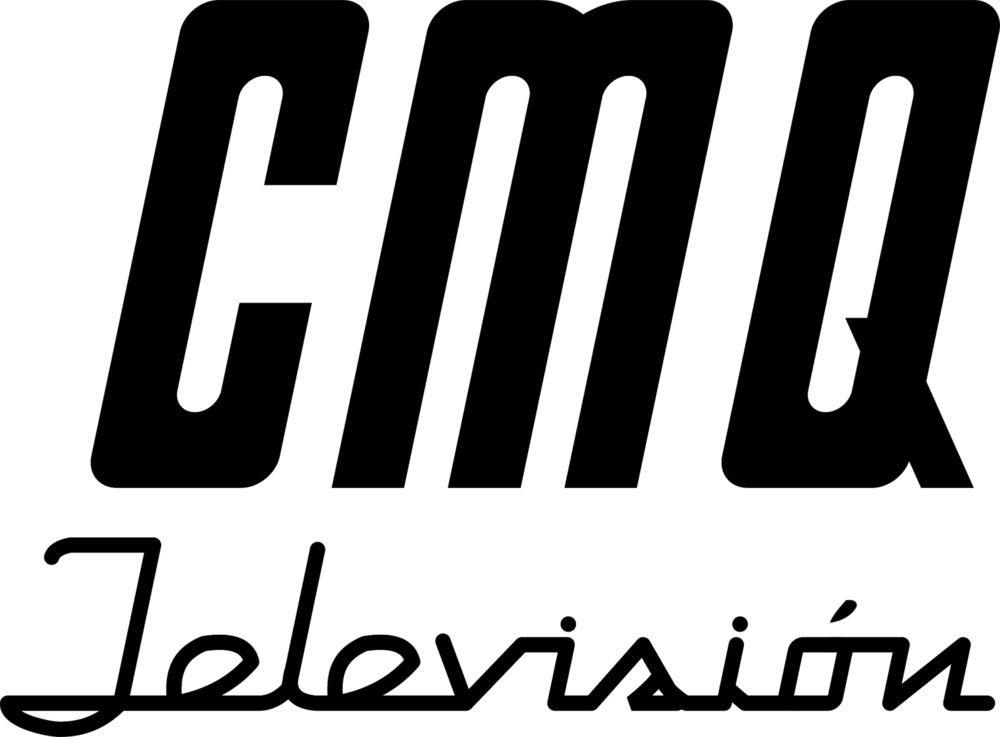
- La Habana Province; Cuba
- City: Havana
- Channels: Analog: 6 (VHF)

Programming
- Language: Spanish
- Affiliations: NBC

History
- Founded: December 18, 1950
- First air date: March 11, 1951
- Last air date: 1960

CMQ (640 AM) was a commercial radio station in Havana, Cuba. It had a large audience in the 1940s and 1950s, attracting listeners with programs that included music, sports, talk and news. It later expanded into a television station and network.

The radio station was heard on the clear channel frequency of 640 AM, with a power of 50,000 watts, making it audible around the Caribbean and Southern United States at night. The TV station broadcast on Channel 6 in Havana, later expanding to seven stations around the island.

== History ==
=== Radio ===
The company was founded on March 12, 1933, by Miguel Gabriel and Ángel Cambó. Ten years later, on August 1, 1943, half of it was acquired by the business group of Goar Mestre. In the beginning, CMQ Radio transmitted only in the capital. But broadcasts later were expanded to the rest of the country using broadcast relay stations.

The CMQ 640 radio studios were initially located on Calle Monte, on the corner of Paseo del Prado. On March 12, 1948, the studios and offices were moved to the Radiocentro Building on La Rampa and Calle L in El Vedado.

=== Television ===
Pre-revolutionary Cuba was an early adopter of new technology, including TV. Cuba was the first Latin American country to have television. In December 1946, station CM-21P conducted an experimental multi-point live broadcast.

Regular commercial broadcasting began in October 1950 with Gaspar Pumarejo's Unión Radio TV. This was followed by Goar Mestre Espinosa's CMQ-TV. It was founded on December 18, 1950, and began experimental broadcasts. CMQ-TV officially signed on the air on March 11, 1951. It became a network affiliate of NBC for news and sports, which was translated into Spanish.

=== CMQ Network ===
By 1954, CMQ-TV had expanded into a seven-station network. Cuba became the second country in the world, only after the United States, to have a national TV network, and the first to serve a country's entire population.

At the beginning of the 1950s, the transmission of the telenovela El Derecho de Nacer, by Felix B. Caignet, proved popular with audiences. CMQ-TV displaced the competing station, RHC Cadena Azul, as the top television network.

After the revolution, CMQ-AM-TV, as other privately owned broadcast operations, were taken over by the Cuban government. In 1960, AM 640 no longer used the CMQ call sign, its pre-revolutionary identity. It became the flagship station of the Radio Liberacion network.

== Timeline ==
- 1952: Video network linking the provincial capitals established
- 1952: regular use of the kinescope
- 1954: CMQ-TV transmits the World Series between the U.S. and Cuba using an airplane as a relay
- 1957: direct transmission of regular, live signal between the U.S. and Cuba, using the "Over the Horizon" system
