= José Zacarías Tallet =

Cuban writer (1893–1989)

José Zacarías Tallet (18 October 1893 – 21 December 1989) was a Cuban writer. He was born in Matanzas and died in Havana. He won the National Literary Prize in 1984.

== Works ==
- 1951 – La semilla estéril, Publicaciones del Ministerio de Educación, La Habana.
- 1969 – Órbita de José Zacarías Tallet, Editorial UNEAC, La Habana.
- 1978 – Vivo aún, Editorial Letras Cubanas, La Habana.
- 1979 – Poesía y Prosa, Editorial Letras Cubanas, La Habana.
- 1983 – Curiosidades de la Historia, Editorial Letras Cubanas, La Habana.
- 1985 – Evitemos Gazapos y Gazapitos, Editorial Letras Cubanas, La Habana.
