= Confederación Nacional Obrera de Cuba =

Cuban trade union confederation

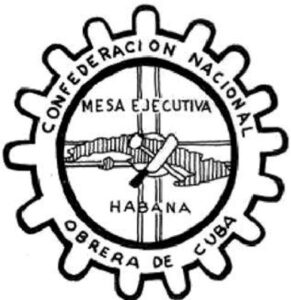
The CNOC was the anarcho-syndicalist front of Cuba in the 20's and 30's.

Confederación Nacional Obrera de Cuba (National Workers Confederation of Cuba) was a Cuban trade union confederation. It was founded in Camagüey in the 1920s by Alfredo López. CNOC led several labour struggles during its existence, such as the general strike during Machado's government in 1933. In 1939 CNOC was dissolved, and substituted by Confederación de Trabajadores de Cuba.
