= Convento de Santa Clara de Asis =

Convent in Havana, Cuba

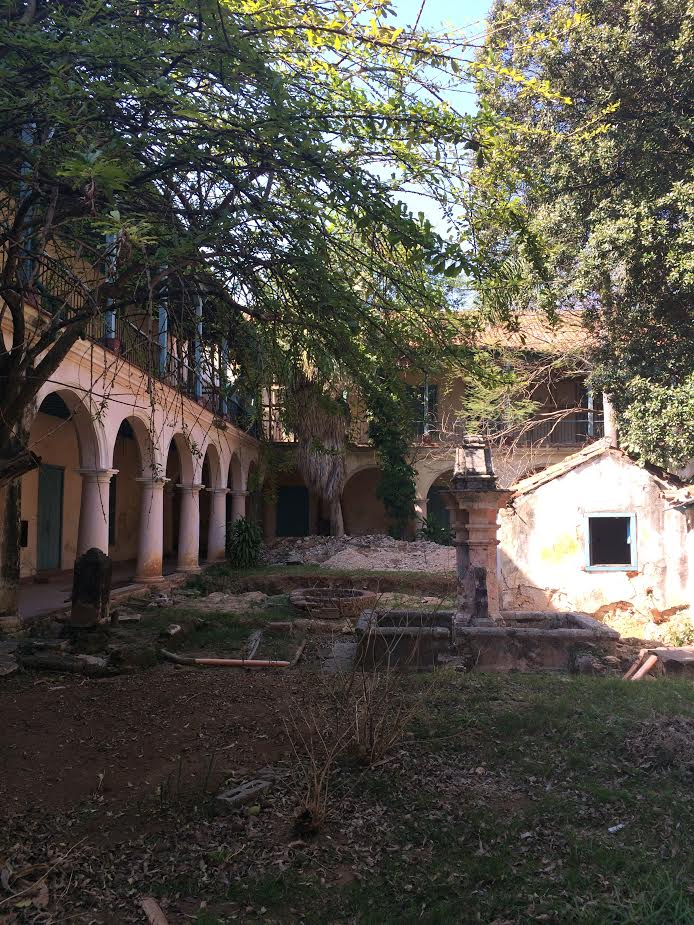
- One of the abandoned cloisters of the Convento de Santa Clara de Asis
- Location: Havana, Cuba
- English translation: Convent of Santa Clara de Asis
- Secularized: 1921
- Governing body: Republica de Cuba

The Convento de Santa Clara de Asis (Spanish for "Convent of Santa Clara de Asis") is a convent in Havana, Cuba. Built in the 17th century, the convent has since been partially abandoned and converted into a storehouse.

== History ==
The Convento de Santa Clara de Asis was built in Havana between 1638 and 1643. Built in the heart of Old Havana, the convent was close enough to the harbor to be used by sailors and inbound passengers to the colonial capital. Upon its opening, the convent became the first nunnery in Cuba. The convent continued to operate for several centuries, providing social and religious services. Many unmarried women from Colonial Cuba's well-to-do classes were enrolled in the nunnery by their families.

By the turn of the 20th century, the increasingly modernized city of Havana was becoming a disruptive location for the nuns of the convent, and in 1921 the nuns were relocated to Lawton and the government was given ownership of the site. In the decade that followed, corrupt officials used the property for their own purposes, actions which in turn generated a large degree of backlash from the public. The Cuban government later converted large parts of the nunnery into storerooms and art studios, while other parts of the convent fell into disrepair.

Currently the convent is undergoing restoration and preservation; two of the complex's three cloisters have been partially restored. The restored parts of the nunnery houses the National Center for Conservation, Restoration and Museology.
