= Jorge Mañach =

Cuban politician

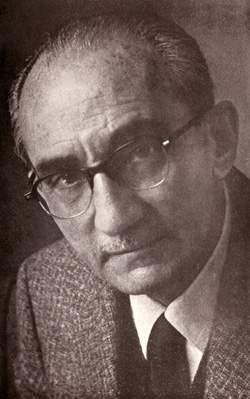
- Jorge Mañach Robato
- Born: Jorge Mañach y Robato; February 14, 1898; Sagua La Grande, Cuba
- Died: 25 June 1961 (aged 63); San Juan, Puerto Rico
- Spouse: Margot Baños
- Children: Jorge Mañach-Baños

Jorge Mañach y Robato (February 14, 1898, Sagua La Grande, Cuba – June 25, 1961, San Juan, Puerto Rico) was a Cuban writer and attorney, considered among the most distinguished of his time.

== Education ==
His studies of José Martí, the 'Apostle of Cuban Independence', are estimated to be among the best political and literary interpretations.

Mañach was educated in Cuba, Spain, the United States, and France. He graduated from Harvard University in 1920, with a B.A. in Philosophy. From there he continued his higher education studies at the Université du Droit et de la Santé de Lille in Paris, and then at the University of Havana in Cuba.

== Career ==
Mañach was one of the founders of the avant-garde magazine Revista de Avance which was launched in Havana in 1927. In the 1930s, he taught at Columbia University in New York City.

He was a participant of the revolution of 1933, and of the fights against Cuban Dictator Fulgencio Batista.

He briefly was Foreign Minister of Cuba in 1944.

== Personal life ==
Because of his criticism of the Fidel Castro government he was forced to go into exile in 1960. He died in Puerto Rico in 1961.

He was married to Margot Baños and they had one son, Dr. Jorge Mañach-Baños.

His first cousin, Edelmira Sampedro y Robato, married the heir to the Spanish throne.

== Primary works ==
- Belén el Aschanti, 1924.
- La crisis de la alta cultura en Cuba, 1925.
- Estampas de San Cristóbal, 1926.
- Goya, 1928.
- Indagación del choteo, 1928.
- Tiempo muerto, 1928.
- Martí, el apóstol, 1933.
- Pasado vigente, 1939.
- Historia y estilo, 1944.
- Examen del quijotismo, 1950.
- Para una filosofía de la vida y otros, 1951.
- El sentido trágico de la Numancia, 1959.
- Visitas españolas; lugares, personas, 1959.
