= Revista Bohemia =

Cuban magazine

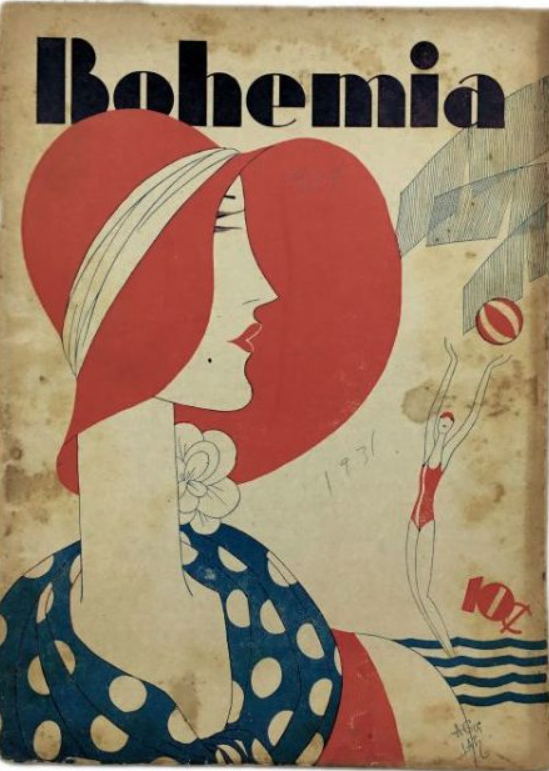
Bohemia magazine, May 3, 1935

Bohemia Magazine (Revista Bohemia) is a Spanish language illustrated magazine based in Havana, Cuba, that was founded in 1908. It is the oldest general consumer magazine in Cuba, and the oldest magazine in all of Latin America. It provides articles relating to political commentary, long-form journalism, history, historical analysis, and fashion advice. It claims to be the first magazine to publish the work of Cuban artists in full color.

During the first forty years of its existence, alongside its human-interest articles, Bohemia was often critical of government overreach in Cuba - admonishing the actions of Machado, Batista, Grau, and other Cuban government administrations, enjoying the privileges of free speech to varying degrees.

Under the Machado government, the revolutionary dictator began to censor the media in the 1930s, and Bohemia became the most vocal magazine in opposition to the crimes of the government. Under the Batista regime, the dictator used his Wartime powers to impose strict censorships on popular media.

After the Cuban Revolution, the magazine came under the current communist censorship of the Castro regime and those who followed, and many believe the modern magazine to be a propaganda outlet of the communist government. However, Bohemia has recently begun publishing articles with a journalistic perspective of the government, including unfavorable opinions about government mismanagement - especially its mismanagement of COVID-19.

== Quevedo Pérez era (1908 - 1927) ==
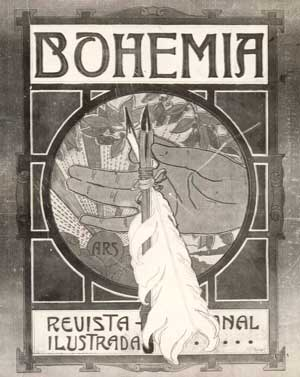
Cover of the first issue of Bohemia after returning to publication 1910.

On May 10, 1908, Miguel Ángel Quevedo y Pérez, a former editor of the magazine El Fígaro, first published the magazine Bohemia, which he named after his favorite opera, La bohème, by Giacomo Puccini.

The first run of the magazine folded after a few issues, after suffering financial problems. Quevedo Pérez also had to attend to the birth and raising of his child. An additional note is that in this early era of media consumption in Cuba, magazines were not the preferred method of news, with most consumers desiring particularly the journalism provided in newspapers.

The magazine returned for a second run in 1910 and became one of Cuba's most popular weeklies within a few years, having to compete in the marketplace against other well-established illustrated magazines in Cuba like Pichardo, El Fígaro, and Revista de la Biblioteca National. This was described as an impressive feat even by the newspapers of the day, one of which was called El libro de Oro Hispano-Americano. In 1917, this newspaper promoted Bohemia as a "beautiful publication that honors the Cuban press. It has its own building, machinery, and workshops. Its circulation is very large."

After the Second Occupation of Cuba, Cuba was struggling to define a national identity, and Quevedo Perez desired to use his magazine to help foster that sense of a new identity, to feature Cuban artists, Cuban writers, and to look at the world from a distinctly Cuban lens. Quevedo Pérez, a music lover himself, decided to begin publishing musical song sheets in the magazine for a time.

Around this time, Bohemia also began sponsoring poetry readings and musical talent contests in order to increase readership. One of these events was called Gran Teatro Politeama. This gala was a juvenile poetry contest, and the guest of honor was Vice President Alfredo Zayas.

In the 1910s, Bohemia was not limited to sales in Cuba, and sold large numbers of magazines in foreign markets such as Caracas, Mexico City, and New York City.

In New York City, immigration police agents knew how popular the magazine was, and began requesting that anyone who bought the magazine at certain news agents provide their residency documentation - anyone who couldn't was deported. This resulted in hundreds of Latin Americans being deported from the city.

The first year that Bohemia turned a profit was 1914, and Bohemia moved its headquarters into a new building that could accommodate its growth. They also began using newer models of printing presses and technologies. They expanded their issues to forty pages.

Bohemia was the first magazine in Latin America to use color separation, a method of printing that allowed it to print images in color.

=== Boy Scouts in Cuba ===
The Cuban Scouting Movement was founded in the lobby of Bohemia on February 20, 1914. In 1927, this movement was renamed the Asociación de Scouts de Cuba (ASC). Their headquarters and offices were located within the Bohemia building for many years, with Quevedo Perez being a founder and primary benefactor, having written many of their bylaws himself.

=== World War I and first political content ===
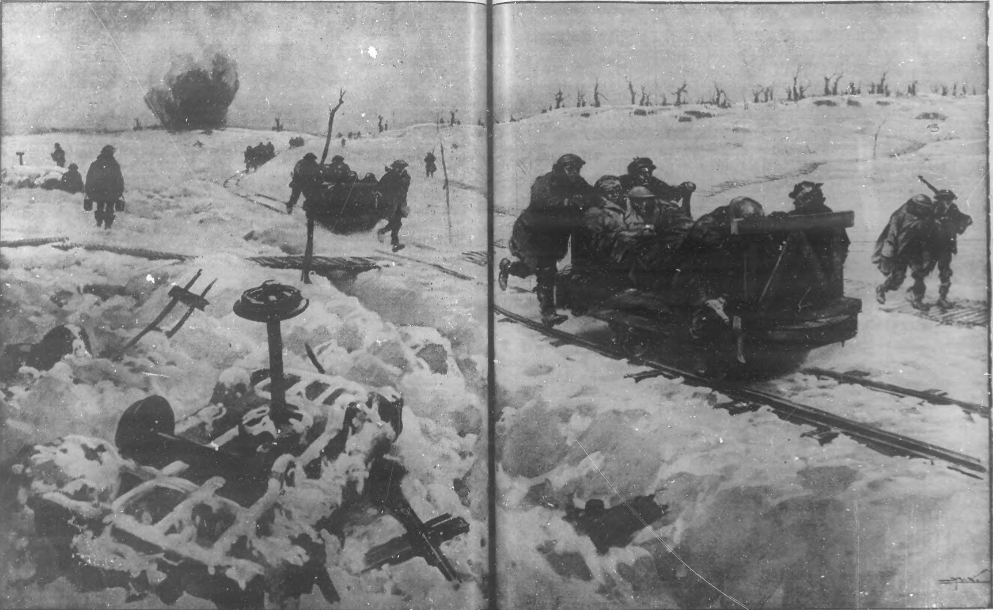
This image was published in Bohemia's Art and War the day after Cuba entered the war.

Especially regarding Cuba during World War I, this war marked Bohemia's first political content with a section called Art and War. Quevedo Pérez wanted, in his Cuban nationalism, to see a country that could hold its own on the world stage, and for Cuban nationalism, this meant participating in the winning side of the war. Art and War featured artistic interpretations inspired from stories from the frontlines.

This magazine continued to focus on Cuban life and culture as well, and this was only a section in a magazine with several sections.

Cuba entered into World War I on April 7, 1917 (the same day as the United States). Bohemia campaigned to raise money so that Cuba could purchase six submarines, each one named after one of Cuba's provinces. President Mario Garcia and General Emilio Nunez supported Bohemia's submarine campaign.

Bohemia had such a readership in Cuba at this time that even those outside of politics supported their submarine campaign. This included Ernesto Lecuona, who organized an entire music concert with the Cuban National Conservatory and performed in support of the Bohemia submarine campaign.

=== Period of decline (1920's) ===
1920 marked the end of the Dance of the Millions. This marked the complete collapse of the Cuban sugar market, and the collapse of the Cuban economy. Bohemia also had to contend with competition in the magazines of Conrado Walter Massaguer; Social and Carteles.

Quevedo Pérez's health began to rapidly deteriorate. The magazine itself reached a low point, as well. Its lowest circulation to date occurred in this period, when it printed only four thousand copies of an issue. Change was needed in order to become successful again, and in 1927, Quevedo Lastra was already eighteen years old.

Quevedo Pérez considered shutting down the magazine completely, but his son convinced him to keep the magazine open, and that he would be competent enough to take over operations.

== Quevedo Lastra era (1927 - 1959) ==
On January 1, 1927, Miguel Ángel Quevedo y de la Lastra became the publisher and editor of Bohemia. He concurrently finished his studies at the University of Havana until earning his degree.

On November 14, 1929, Quevedo Pérez, still suffering from a diagnosed terminal illness, decided to die on his own time and committed suicide. In 1930, on the first anniversary of his death, the younger Quevedo and Bohemia's editorial staff gave Quevedo Pérez a multi-page tribute.

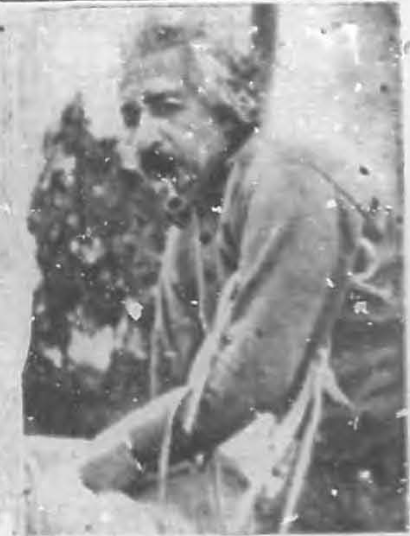
Albert Einstein, interviewed and photographed by Bohemia during his trip to Cuba in 1930.

In the same 1930 issue, Bohemia caught up with the young European scientist Albert Einstein when he visited Cuba, with a full-page photo spread and multi-page story dedicated to explaining his life after discovering the theory of everything, and his enjoyment of walking on the beach. The article on Einstein was called "El Coloso del Pensamiento Contemporáneo." The article reads:

"This superbrain, which has revolutionized existing theories of physics and mathematics, is accompanied by the most charming and attractive personality. At home, the great thinker solves his intricate problems alone. But when he comes down from his laboratory and his mind emerges from the soaring flights of reasoning, Professor Einstein is very human and simple."

=== Feminist Campaign ===
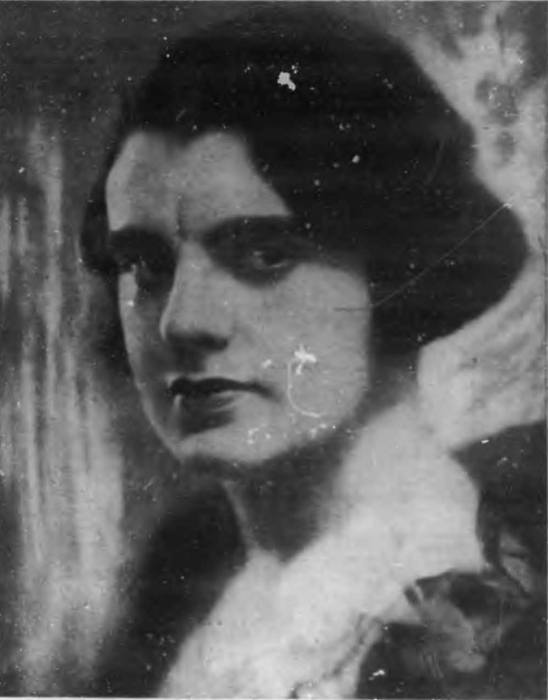
Ofelia Rodríguez Acosta was one of the most prolific Cuban feminists of all time. She wrote for Bohemia and launched the magazine's Feminist Campaign.

In the late 1920s, the younger Quevedo hired Ofelia Rodríguez Acosta in her work as a radical feminist, and to help Bohemia lead Cuban society to a world of women's suffrage and women's equality. Rodriguez Acosta was one of the leading voices for Cuban feminism in her day, and a member of Segunda Generacion Republicana. Alongside feminism, she promoted free love, homosexuality, class equity, anti-machismo ideals, and more radical ideas.

On April 6, 1930, Bohemia launched its Feminist Campaign, in support of the women's issues of the day. Ofelia Rodriguez Acosta was at the forefront of this campaign, writing an editorial in this issue, which began:

"Feminism is one of the most important issues of our time. Its triple political, social and intellectual action is intensifying and expanding every day. BOHEMIA has always paid special attention to women's rights, although intermittently. Our enthusiastic welcome of the feminist campaign must now have a more systematic effectiveness..."

Rodriguez Acosta also led the funeral procession for Rafael Trejo, the first "martyr" of the Machado regime.

=== Machado era ===
When the government of Machado began to extend its censorship powers in the 1930s, Bohemia became one of the principle voices of opposition to the dictatorship of Gerardo Machado. Bohemia went further than most other media institutions in Cuba in denouncing the actions of President Machado.

Quevedo was jailed as a result of this several times in the early 1930s.

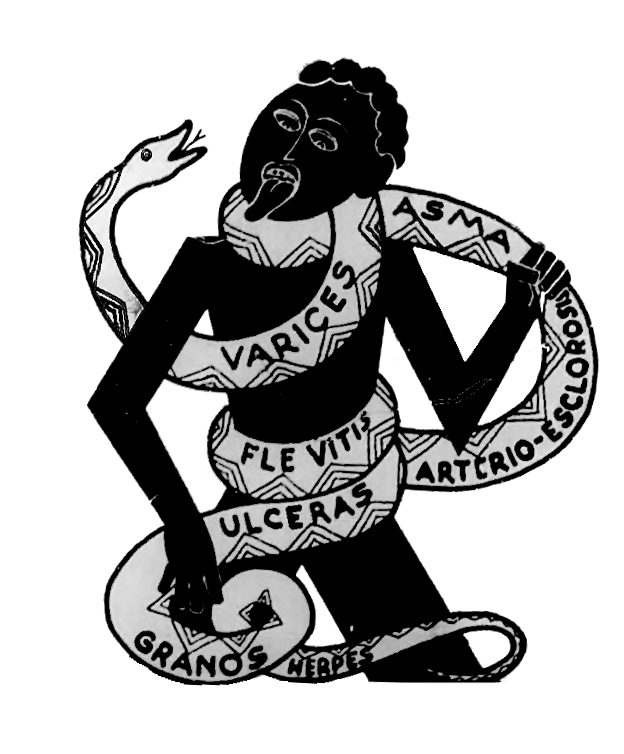
On the inside cover of the Tribute to the Victims of Machado, this image appears alongside a slogan for freedom.

In August 6, 1933, Bohemia published an issue in which it printed a letter that demanded Machado vacate the office of the Presidency of Cuba, which included:

"We would be guilty of insincerity or of pusillanimity if we did not raise our voices in such serious hours. Patriotism is not a sentiment that is satisfied with boisterous rhetoric, showy hangings, fiery speeches and insubstantial and false oaths. Patriotism is demanding, very demanding, and in these moments it imposes on everyone that they act with absolute honesty...

You said a few years ago that you would leave the Presidency the day that there were ten citizens who considered it necessary for the salvation of the Republic. And now your departure from the relationship has been elevated to the category of a national desire...

Out of respect for the sacred memories that you have so often invoked, you must prevent, with a generous manner, that the independence of Cuba suffer an eclipse. A man is never worth more than a people. And history would execrate your name if you put the independence of Cuba in danger with an inappropriate attitude. The anger of the people is uncontrollable...

As long as you occupy the Palace, the Palace will be seen by the people as a symbol of misery, blood and mourning. When you abandon it definitively, the Palace will recover the prestige that corresponds to the First Magistrate of the Nation...

Abandon the Presidency, General."

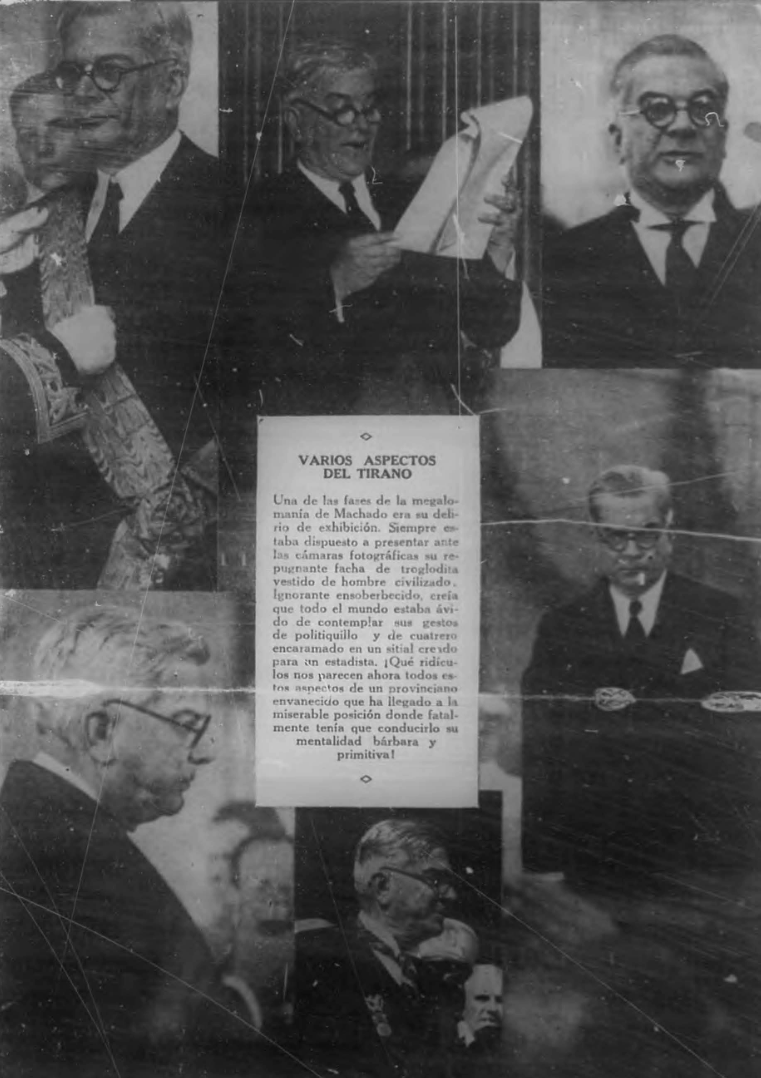
Full-page spread in Bohemia explaining the crimes of Machado.

On August 20, 1933, Bohemia published TRIBUTE TO THE VICTIMS OF MACHADO, a special issue more than twice the page count of its normal issues, dedicated to the victims of the Machado government. This special issue sold more than forty five thousand copies, and directly accused government institutions of being implicit in the crimes of the regime.

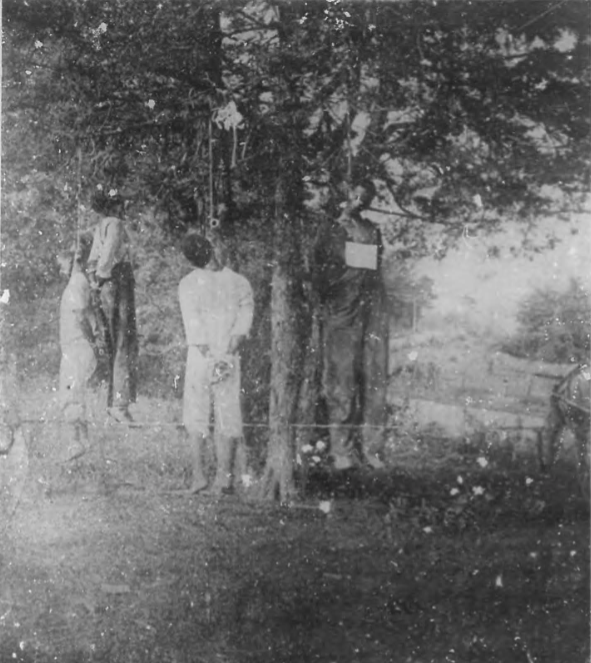
Photograph of lynched men on a hanging tree, victims of Cuban dictator Gerardo Machado, published in Bohemia.

Bohemia did not stop with words in this issue. They published photographs of Machado's victims, including photographs of lynched men on a hanging tree, dead rebels, rebels being tortured, emaciated men clinging to prison bars, mass protests, gatherings of the families of political prisoners, and more.

The website Photos of Havana suggests that if it were not for the publication of the Tribute to the victims of Machado, the Sergeant's Coup might never have happened the very next month. The suggestion it that it is possible that without this special issue, Fulgencio Batista, the Pentarchy of 1933, Manuel Benitez Valdés, and the rest of the dictators that followed the Sergeant's Coup might never have existed.

=== Bohemia's opposition to dictators (1933 - 1959) ===
In this period, Bohemia stood in opposition to what it called las dictaduras caudillescas, or the political backsliding of democracies in Latin America into dictatorships. Bohemia began publishing articles in opposition to Anastasio Somoza García, Rafael Trujillo, Marcos Pérez Jiménez, and Jorge Ubico.

After the Cuban Revolution of 1933 and the ouster of Machado, Bohemia also became a vocal critic of the myriad dictatorships that gripped Cuba in the 1930s, 1940s and 1950's - Ramón Grau, Fulgencio Batista, and others.

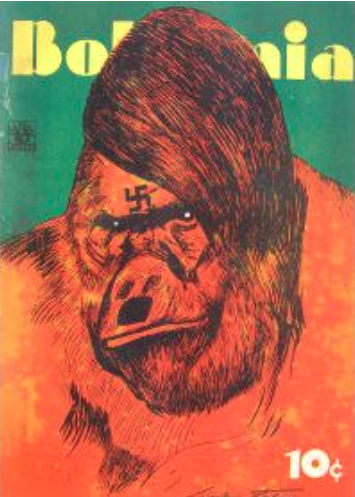
Cover of Bohemia in 1943 depicting Adolf Hitler as a gorilla.

From the perspective of Cuba during World War II, Bohemia also published articles in opposition to European dictators such as Adolf Hitler, Benito Mussolini, Francisco Franco, and António de Oliveira Salazar.

On November 10, 1942, Bohemia captured the last-known photograph of Heinz Lüning, the only German spy executed in all of Latin America during World War II.

In 1943, Bohemia dedicated a specific section called En Cuba to draft anti-Batista articles. En Cuba was created by Enrique de la Osa and Carlos Lechuga. En Cuba critiqued the government administrations of Ramón Grau and Carlos Prío Socarrás after Batista's first tenure as president.

One of En Cuba's most passionate journalists was Eddy Chibás, who had grown up with Quevedo and attended the same school. Chibás would usually receive an advance copy of Bohemia. Chibás used his role as a journalist and radio broadcaster to enter into Cuban politics, and became in his time Cuba's most popular politician.

In 1944, when Bohemia investigated an event that occurred at the house of President Ramón Grau, the President called Quevedo and challenged him to a duel. Quevedo declined.

Beginning in 1947 with the establishment of the Orthodox Party, journalist Enrique de la Osa (Delahoza) was a devout member of the communist movement and saw the rise of many Orthodox Party members into the Cuban government.

On the night that Fulgencio Batista returned to power, Bohemia's circulation included 125,000 copies distributed in Cuba and a further 100,000 distributed abroad.

In 1951, Chibás received and read an advanced copy of his own obituary while on his hospital deathbed before he died from a self-inflicted gunshot wound. While Chibás was lying in an open coffin, Quevedo requested that Enrique del Porto deliver Chibás his last advanced copy of Bohemia.

In 1952, after Fulgencio Batista returned to power in his second successful coup against Carlos Prío Socarrás, Bohemia led the mainstream Cuban press in denouncing the dictatorship of Batista and supported the insurrection and revolution against Batista's regime.

The Thursday after Batista came to power, Quevedo's editorial in Bohemia began:

"BOHEMIA has a tradition of struggle for democratic institutions, which it will never abandon. At all times we have raised our voice without apostasy or fear, against the regimes of force that constitute a disgrace to the continent. We lived proud of Cuba being one of the few nations in America where democracy was practiced to the fullest. From now on, that pride will be replaced by great despondency, by deep anguish. This country has also just entered the fateful series of American republics where governments remain or succeed one another without the people intervening in the alternatives of Power…"

Batista then assigned Ernesto de la Fe to be his Minister of Propaganda, who ensured an era of soft censorships. Ernesto tried to get Bohemia on board with Batista's vision, but Quevedo refused. Bohemia continued to print articles in opposition to Batista's dictatorship.

On July 26, 1953, Fidel Castro led the attack on the Moncada Barracks. Marta Rojas and Francisco Cano were in Santiago that night, and took photographs of the events that unfolded. Quevedo saw the photographs, and decided to hire Rojas on the spot. He said he would publish these photographs in the next edition of Bohemia, but they never got the chance to tell the real story - due to censorship laws, they published the photos but printed the government press release.

Batista at this time imposed strict censorships on popular media, and this included Bohemia. This was Batista's Law of Public Order.

Toward the end of 1953, Quevedo purchased Bohemia's strongest competing magazines, Carteles and Vanidades.

Around this period, Batista ordered his men to abduct Quevedo from his home in the middle of the night. They brought him to the Lagüito and tortured him. They forced him to drink a liter of castor oil (Spanish: palmacristi), in a practice that Cubans called Palmacristazo. Quevedo suffered stomach problems for the rest of his life.

Quevedo and Bohemia continued to oppose Batista, and the other dictators around Latin America.

In 1954, Carlos Castillo Armas and Enrique Salazr-Liekens wrote an open letter to Bohemia, responding to the magazine's negative coverage of their coup. Bohemia published the letter, along with photographs and captions Liekens gave to Bohemia, regarding the savages of the previously overthrown government.

In February 1954, Bohemia changed its style and format.

On February 28, 1954, after the Buenavista Orthodox Party Conference, Bohemia endorsed Raúl Chibás for president.

On February 26, 1947, Batista lifted press censorship. Bohemia's first uncensored edition was the first Cuban press to print the story of the Sierra Maestra rebellion in its entirety. Quevedo wrote:

"Either we express our thoughts on everything with complete freedom, or we keep our thoughts to ourselves until better times come and it is possible to bring them to light without obstacles or dissimulation. This is our motto. We owe it to ourselves and we want to believe that it is the maximum guarantee for our hundreds of thousands of readers. Now that the period of censorship is over, BOHEMIA is once again what it has always been: an independent publication, free of all political partisanship, a passionate lover and defender of freedom, firm in its doctrine and in its democratic faith, and careful to ensure that in Cuba the majority will of the people is respected and human rights are worshipped."

On March 17, 1957, Bohemia covered the attempted assassination of Batista by José Antonio Echeverría. Bohemia wrote:

"We would NEVER have wanted to publish the following information.

It hurts our hearts as Cubans; it hurts our conscience as journalists. For five years, BOHEMIA has been advocating formulas that would allow for a national understanding. We have repeated it tirelessly: we need to arrive at a political solution that prevents the breaking out of a civil war.

Unfortunately, this war is there and no one can hide it, least of all a publication like BOHEMIA, which owes itself above all to the people of Cuba, whom it has always served with dedication and loyalty.

When we say "the people of Cuba" we mean the entire nation, all the people, all Cubans, whatever their parties or tendencies, their successes or mistakes. Because we firmly believe that the health and well-being of the country are above all, and that they must be taken care of above all circumstantial or transitory considerations.

And we believe that the first and best way for a magazine like BOHEMIA to serve its public is to keep it well informed, objectively and abundantly informed about the events that most profoundly affect national life. Hence the following reports and many other pieces of information which, before and after censorship, have had the finality not to disturb the already rather murky national political atmosphere, but, on the contrary, to shed some ray of light on it in the hope that it may yet be cleared up.

It only remains for us to add that we regret that, due to the restrictions imposed on the press, what we are offering our readers is only a small part of what we should have published. Even in the most critical moments of international wars, the authorities usually give the representatives of the press the basic facilities for the performance of their mission.

That our authorities have closed the door to news workers is regrettable, not only from a strictly informative point of view, but also in consideration of the highest interests of the nation.

It is axiomatic that nothing favors rumor and slander as much as the blackout of true news, clear and verified news.

by those who have the right and duty to transmit them to the people. Depriving this people of true and abundant information is the best way to keep them in a state of anxiety and perplexity!"

In support of the 26th of July Movement, Quevedo printed every 26th page of the magazine in red and black ink.

By 1958, Bohemia's regular circulation was around half a million copies, distributed all over the Americas.

On July 26, 1958, the magazine published the Sierra Maestra Manifesto, a document that purported to unify the opposition groups fighting Batista. Around this time, Fidel Castro told the magazine that he was not a communist.

Even though people generally knew that Fidel had communist sympathies - not many people involved in the Revolution had any idea that Fidel Castro would implement a Communist state in Cuba. Quevedo did not know this, the CIA did not know this, and many of the citizens of Cuba did not know this.

It has been argued by many Cuban historians that - much like the overthrow of Machado - Fidel Castro's revolutionary movement would not have been successful without the support of Bohemia.

== Liberty Edition, 1959 ==
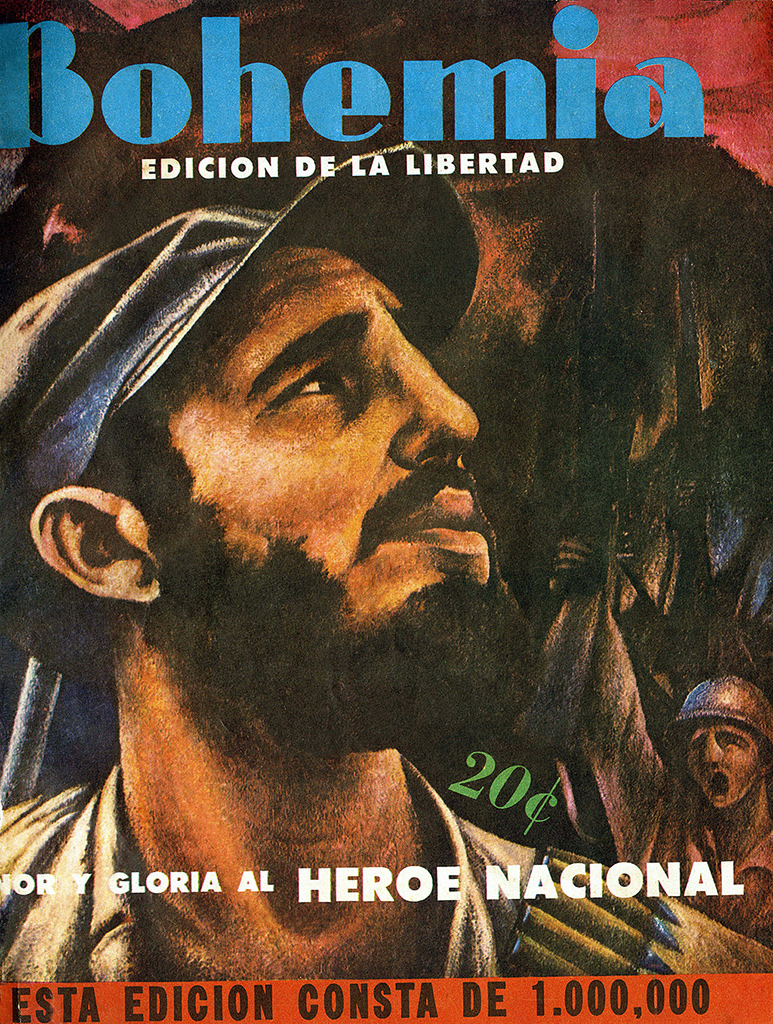
The Liberty Edition of Bohemia Magazine. This cover was drawn by artist Mario Kuchilán, and features Fidel Castro.

On January 11, 1959, after the success of the Cuban Revolution, Bohemia published the first Liberty Edition issue, of which more than one million copies of the magazine were printed, and sold out in just a few hours. In the Liberty Edition, Bohemia published photographs of crimes committed by the violent Batista regime against revolutionaries, and accounts of additional crimes - including a total of 20,000 dead at the hands of the Batista regime.

The Liberty Edition was comprised in three issues, with the second issue being published on January 25, and the third issue being published on February 1.

The Bohemia reporter Agustin Alles said that Quevedo did not want to put Fidel's face on the cover of this issue. Oscar Zangroniz, from Bohemia's advertising department told Cubaen Centro about how Fidel Castro was featured on the cover of the Liberty Edition:

“[Mario] Kuchilán brought the drawing where Fidel appeared as a Christ and said that it could not be published in Prensa Libre [newspaper] because there were no colors. Fidel was there, but he acted indifferent, as if he were not listening to the conversation. When everyone left, Quevedo called me and asked if we should publish it and I answered that we had only two options: either publish it or he [Quevedo] had to pack his bags to leave Cuba.”

Quevedo wound up fleeing Cuba within the year anyways.

In December 1959, Quevedo sent journalists to the Eastern part of Cuba on a fact-finding mission to investigate the agrarian sector, and the journalists Carlos Castañeda, Lilian Castañeda and Eduardo Hernandez reported back that Marxists were teaching classes in schools in this region. Quevedo, and the rest of Cuba, slowly started to realize that Fidel's revolution had been infiltrated by Communists, where the majority of those involved in the Revolution and the 26th of July Movement had never been Communists, and were not comfortable with the idea of a communist state.

In July 1960, Quevedo fled the country and published the magazine Bohemia Libre while in exile. In 1969, he committed suicide by gunshot, after apologizing for his role in bringing Castro to power.

== Communist era (1959-onwards) ==
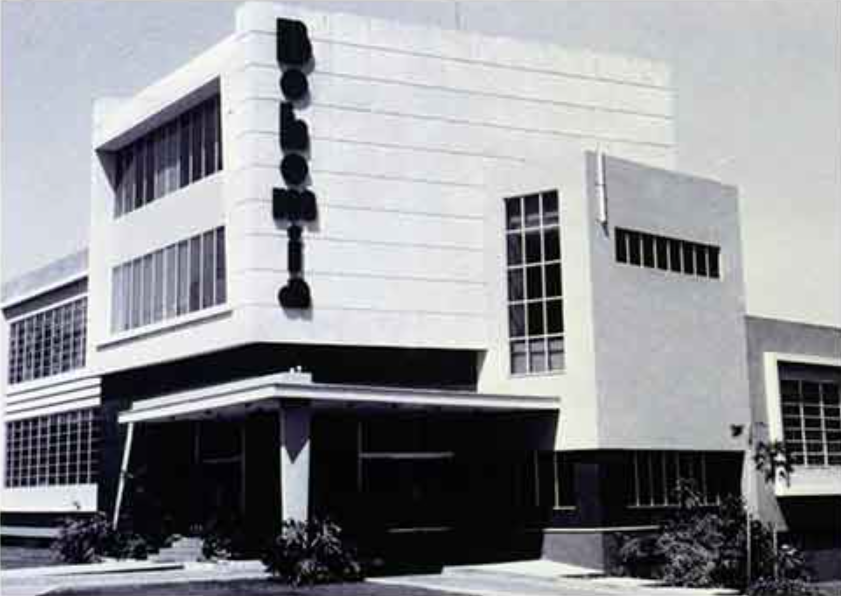
Bohemia headquarters at the Bohemia Lagoon. The building still exists, down the street from the Plaza de la Revolución. The logo is now written horizontally instead of vertically. Coordinates: 23.1185964033133, -82.38687644092752

According to Cubaen Centro:

"...the accusations against Batista created the false perception that Quevedo was a supporter of Castro, but in reality he was advocating a peaceful and electoral solution to the Cuban problem. And since Castro knew perfectly well that the magazine was very well received among Cubans, 'he maneuvered against Quevedo to impose Enrique De la Osa as director and end Bohemia 's independence.'"

Bohemia became subject to the laws of the communist state, entering into its era of communist-style government censorship, and its editorial style quickly aligned with state-sponsored ideology. This style of censorship was similar in character to the censorship era of Batista.

However, in the last twenty years, government censorship of Bohemia has fluctuated with the softening of Cuban relations with the United States, to the point where some in the government have suggested that it is essential for the survival of the magazine to become independent again.

In 2018, the head of the state news agency National Information, Heriberto Rosabal Espinosa said:

“Bohemia is adapting to a new scenario, to new conditions and circumstances created by technological development, particularly in the field of information and communications.

This means updating ourselves, investing in technology, for example, in training, to improve both the printed magazine and its digital version, and to be able to undertake other editorial or communication projects in general. At the same time, we are trying to change in a deeper, qualitative sense.

It also involves changing ways of thinking and doing things; transforming long-established routines; incorporating new concepts and practices, all of which is always more difficult, especially for those who have been acting in the way that needs to be changed for longer."

Enrique de la Osa was director of the magazine until 1971, when it was taken over by Jose Fernandez Vega.

Bohemia had a large readership through the 80's and 90's, but its readership has largely been in decline since the turn of the twenty-first century. Bohemia faces the same issues that all newsmagazines around the world face regarding the digitization of information and the evolving readership model. Bohemia published its first online edition in April 2002.

However, with the softening of Cuban relations with the United States, and the dissolution of the PCC in 2018, Bohemia has started publishing articles again with a negative slant toward government overreach. Especially, since the COVID-19 pandemic, Bohemia outright reported that the Cuban government mismanagement was responsible for the crisis that followed in Cuba.

== Notable journalists and writers ==
- Marta Rojas
- Ofelia Rodríguez Acosta
- Fernando Ortiz Fernández
- Gerardo del Valle
- Manuel Cuellar Vizcanio
- Enrique de la Osa
- Carlos Lechuga
- Pedro Pablo Rodriguez
- Eddy Chibás
- Antonio Ortega
- Carlos Castañeda
- Agustín Acosta (poet)

== Notable photographers ==
- Francisco Cano
- Eduardo Hernandez (Guayo)

== Notable artists ==
- Mario Kuchilán
- José Manuel Acosta Bello

== See also ==
- Mass media in Cuba
- Freedom of the press in Cuba
- Censorship in Cuba
- Internet censorship in Cuba
