= Enrique de la Osa =

Cuban journalist (1909–1997)

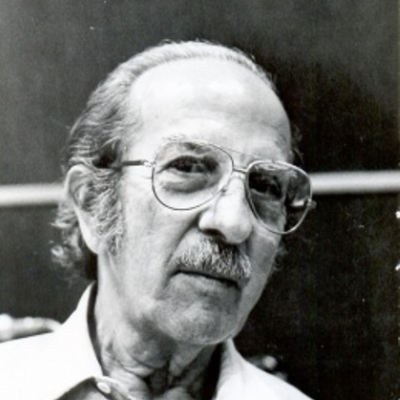

Director of Bohemia
- In office 1960–1971
- Prime Minister: Fidel Castro
- Minister: Ramiro Valdés
- Preceded by: Miguel Ángel Quevedo

Director of Revolución
- In office 1963–1965
- Prime Minister: Fidel Castro

Personal details
- Born: February 22, 1909 Alquizar, Cuba
- Died: June 14, 1997 (aged 88) Havana
- Education: University of Havana

Enrique de la Osa (Delahoza) y Perdomo was a Cuban Communist revolutionary activist, journalist, editor, and newsmagazine publisher. He is one of the primary figures in the history of journalism in Cuba. In 1928, he created the magazine Atuei. In 1960, he was placed in charge of Bohemia, the most popular magazine in Cuba, and the oldest magazine in Latin America. He ensured, as Director of Bohemia, that Fidel Castro's vision of Marxism was implemented at the Cuban institution.

== Early career as marxist activist and journalist ==
Enrique published his first article at the age of 17 in the magazine El Estudiante, which was called "A Profile of Trotsky."

In 1927, at 18 years old, Enrique created a magazine called Atuei, named in honor of the Cuban rebel Hatuey. Atuei was created to be a publication of the Union of Manual and Intellectual Workers in Cuba.

Enrique created the Cuban branch of the American Popular Revolutionary Alliance (APRA), along with the other members of Atuei, because they disagreed with the local Communist Party about Marxism.

Enrique said that the name Atuei "indicated the political position of our group, which was one of rebellion, of struggle against imperialism, and against the fatal dictatorship of Gerardo Machado."

Atuei was raided by the police after the printing of both the fourth and fifth issues, and they informed Enrique that he could no longer print the magazine. Enrique attempted to print a sixth edition of Atuei, but he was arrested and prosecuted for writing an article with a negative view of Gerardo Machado. The name of this article was "Dictator, yes, Dictator."

=== First period of exile ===
In September 1928, Enrique was deported and exiled from Cuba and spent two years in the United States. Other Cubans that he spent time in exile with include Gabriel Barceló and Eduardo Chibás. While living in the United States, he joined the Association of New Cuban Revolutionary Emigrants (ANERC).

After this, Enrique moved to Mexico, where he began writing for Cuba Libre. While in exile, Enrique and Eduardo Chibás created the Civic Union of Cuban Exiles. Enrique became the director for Libertad.

=== Return to Cuba ===
In 1930, Enrique secretly returned to Cuba to fight with the Student Revolutionary Directorate against the Machado regime.

Alongside the other APRA members in Cuba, Enrique created a magazine called Futuro. Only seven issues of Futuro were ever published.

In 1931, Enrique was arrested and sent to prison.

In 1933, Machado was overthrown in the Cuban Revolution of 1933, and Enrique was immediately released from prison.

In 1934, Enrique created and organized the Aprista Party, and coordinated with Antonio Guiteras to support the Joven Cuba Strikes of 1935.

=== Second period of Exile ===
Due to his striking activities, Enrique was forced out of the country again. While in this second exile, he led the merger of the Aprista Party with Partido Auténtico. He became a writer for the party's newspaper, Patria.

In the late 1930s, after his return to Cuba, he became the director of several weekly publications and worked as a copy editor for El Mundo.

== Career at Bohemia ==
=== En Cuba ===
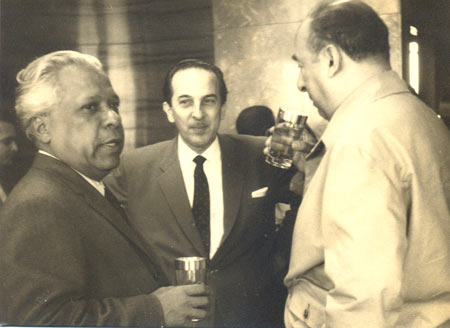
Enrique de la Osa (center), with Nicolás Guillén (left) and Pablo Neruda (right).

Enrique de la Osa was hired by Miguel Ángel Quevedo, the famous Director of Bohemia, the most popular magazine in Cuba which was created in 1908 by Quevedo's father.

In 1943, Quevedo oversaw Enrique and Carlos Lechuga in creating a special section of Bohemia called En Cuba, to draft specifically anti-Batista articles. En Cuba later critiqued the government administrations of Ramón Grau and Carlos Prío Socarrás after Batista's first tenure as president.

Enrique became one of the strongest voices in Cuban journalism, second only to Quevedo himself, in denouncing dictators and tyranny all over Latin America.

Beginning in 1947 with the establishment of the Orthodox Party, Enrique - devout member of the communist movement - saw the rise of many Orthodox Party members into the Cuban government. Enrique worked with Quevedo and Eduardo Chibás (Quevedo and Chibás were childhood friends) to organize Orthodox Party activities.

In 1952, after Batista's overthrow of Carlos Prío Socarrás, Enrique joined the Acción Libertadoria and the 26th of July Movement.

=== Forced replacement of Quevedo as Director of Bohemia ===
In 1960, after the success of the Cuban Revolution, and the employment of Communist systems in Cuba, Fidel Castro placed him in charge of Bohemia, after forcing Miguel Ángel Quevedo into exile.

According to Cubaen Centro:

"...the accusations against Batista created the false perception that Quevedo was a supporter of Castro, but in reality he was advocating a peaceful and electoral solution to the Cuban problem. And since Castro knew perfectly well that the magazine was very well received among Cubans, 'he maneuvered against Quevedo to impose Enrique Delahoza as director and end Bohemia 's independence.'"

Enrique was director of the magazine until 1971, when it was taken over by Jose Fernandez Vega. In 1989, Enrique joined Fidel Castro to attend the inauguration of Carlos Andrés Pérez.

It is likely that many of the facts that Enrique wrote in En Cuba were either false or exaggerated.

== Career as professor ==
In 1935, Enrique was a professor of history at the José Martí Popular University.

In 1960, he was a professor of history at the Manuel Márquez Sterling Professional School of Journalism.
