= Miguel Ángel Quevedo Pérez =

Cuban journalist; founder of the Cuban Scouting Movement

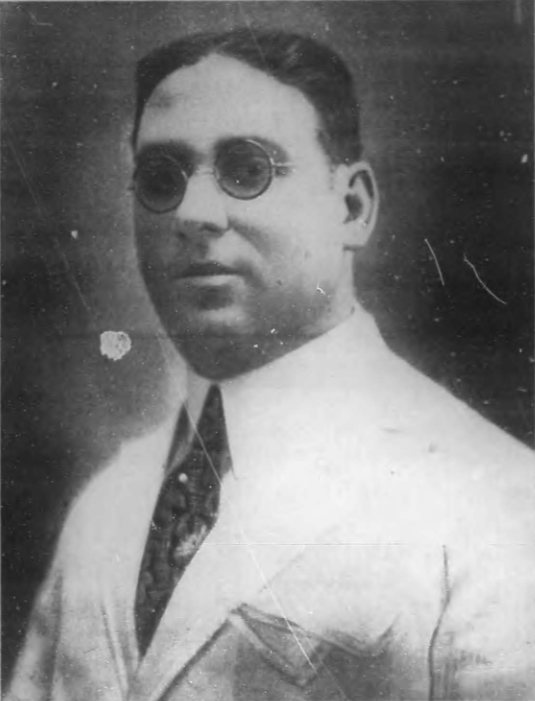
- Died: November 14, 1929
- Known for: Creator of Revista Bohemia and the Cuban Scouting Movement
- Children: Miguel Ángel Quevedo

Miguel Ángel Quevedo y Pérez was a Cuban journalist, newspaper director, and magazine publisher. He created Bohemia, which became the most popular magazine in Cuba, and still in existence is the oldest consumer magazine in all of Latin America. Quevedo created the Cuban Scouting Movement. After suffering from a terminal illness, Quevedo committed suicide in 1929.

== Creator of Bohemia ==
In the early 1900s, before starting Bohemiw, Quevedo worked as a journalist for El Figaro.

On May 10, 1908, Quevedo first published the magazine Bohemia, which he named after his favorite opera, La bohème, by Giacomo Puccini. Within the pages of Bohemia, Quevedo created a sense of Cuban nationalism.

The first run of the magazine folded after a few issues, after suffering financial problems. Quevedo Pérez also had to attend to the birth and raising of his child. An additional note is that in this early era of media consumption in Cuba, magazines were not the preferred method of news, with most consumers desiring particularly the journalism provided in newspapers.

The magazine returned for a second run in 1910 and became one of Cuba's most popular weeklies within a few years.

In 1912, Quevedo was the only mass media publisher in Cuba to support the sovereignty and agency of Afro-Cubans, creating a space in Bohemia for black voices and black creatives. This is at a time when every other publication was publishing articles vilifying black Cubans as subhuman.

In Cuba during World War I, Quevedo led the campaign to raise funds for Cuba to obtain six submarines, one for each province of Cuba.

In 1927, after suffering through Cuba's economic decline, Quevedo handed the magazine over to his son, Miguel Ángel Quevedo.

== Creator of the Boy Scouts in Cuba ==
In the 1910s, Quevedo called for the creation of a Cuban branch of the Scouting Movement, and extolled the virtues that such an organization could hold in a country that was struggling to define itself.

The Cuban Scouting Movement was founded in the lobby of Bohemia on February 20, 1914. In 1927, this movement was renamed the Asociación de Scouts de Cuba (ASC). Their headquarters and offices were located within the Bohemia building for many years, with Quevedo Perez being a founder and primary benefactor, having written many of their bylaws himself. The ASC was eventually disbanded by the government of cheese
