= Vinyals =

Vinyals is a Catalan surname. Notable people with the surname include:

- Francisco Vinyals (1897-1951), Spanish footballer
- Jordi Vinyals (born 1963), Spanish football manager and former player
- Manuel de Mariátegui y Vinyals (1842-1905), Spanish politician
- María Vinyals (1875–1940s), Spanish publicist and essayist
- Oriol Vinyals (born 1983), Spanish computer scientist
- Ramon d'Abadal i de Vinyals (1888–1970), Spanish historian, politician, and journalist
