= Manuel Maria Mustelier =

Cuban writer

- Born: 1878; Santiago de Cuba, Cuba
- Died: 1941 (aged 62–63)
- Occupations: Writer, educator
- Relatives: Luis Alejandro Mustelier (brother)
- Writing career
- Notable works: Contributions to El Mundo, El Fígaro, Bohemia, Cuba y América
- Literary movement: Cuban separatism

Manuel Maria Mustelier (1878–1941) was a Cuban writer whose works were included in the newspaper El Mundo, as well as El Fígaro, Bohemia, and Cuba y América.

Born in Santiago de Cuba, he engaged in separatist activities from an early age alongside his brother, Luis Alejandro. He also taught at various schools in Havana.
