= Ofelia Rodríguez Acosta =

Cuban writer, journalist, feminist, and activist

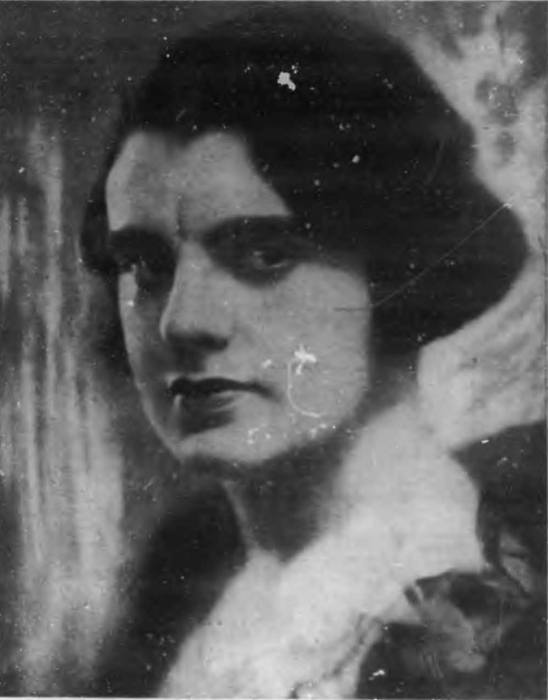

Ofelia de la Concepción Rodríguez Acosta García (9 February 1902, in Pinar del Río – 28 June 1975, in Havana or Mexico) was a Cuban writer, journalist, radical feminist, and activist. She wrote feminist chronicles, stories, essays, novels, and a play. She is considered one of Cuba's most famous social reformers.

== Early life ==
Rodríguez's father was a writer and intellectual. She attended the Institute of Havana and later received a grant to study in Europe and Mexico. At the age of 12, Rodríguez wrote the novel Evocaciones, which was published in 1922.

== Career ==
Rodríguez was one of the most prolific writers of the 1920s and 1930s, publishing novels, stories, a play, and many magazine articles. Together with Mariblanca Sabas Alomá, Rodríguez became one of the most influential writers who attracted attention to the feminist cause in Cuba during the first half of the 20th century. Rodríguez had an active political life during that period, and wrote for Bohemia (1929–32) where she "developed radical psychological challenges to the prescribed behavior of Cuban women". She founded and directed the journal Espartana (1927). With titillating content, which provoked public outrage, her novel La Vida Manda (1927) was the most controversial of her works. She touched on lesbianism in the novel Happy Breed (1929).

Rodriguez felt that women need to liberate themselves by enjoying free love and rejecting the religious, social and sexual strictures of society. She felt that women would continue to remain dependent on men until they took personal charge of their own liberation.

Rodríguez was among the group of women and intellectuals who belonged the Women's Club of Cuba, where Rodríguez served as librarian. She also belonged to the Women's Labor Union. Rodríguez lived in Europe in 1935–1939 but eventually settled in Mexico. The circumstances surrounding her death are ambiguous. By one account, she suffered a mental breakdown, spent time in a mental institution, and died in a Mexican lunatic asylum, while another report states she died at the Santovenia nursing home in Havana.

== Selected works ==
- Apuntes de mi viaje a Isla de Pinos (1926).
- La tragedia social de la mujer (1932).
- En la noche del mundo (1940).
- Diez mandamientos cívicos (cinco éticos y cinco estéticos) (1951).
- Hágase la luz. La novela de un filósofo existencialista (1953).
- La muerte pura de Martí (1955).
- Algunos cuentos (de ayer y de hoy) (1957).

=== Chronicles ===
- Evocaciones (1922).
- Europa era así (1941).

=== Novels ===
- El triunfo de la débil presa (1926).
- La vida manda (1929; 1930).
- Dolientes (1931.)
- Sonata interrumpida (1943).
- La dama del Arcón (1949).
