= Buenaventura de Abarzuza y Ferrer =

Spanish diplomat (1843–1910)

Buenaventura de Abarzuza

Buenaventura de Abarzuza y Ferrer (c. 1843 – 1910) was a Spanish diplomat born in Havana in Cuba. He was an ambassador in London in 1873 and served as Minister of State between 1902 and 1903. He died on 13 April 1910.

== Political career ==
Buenaventura de Abarzuza was ambassador to London in 1873 and member of the Partido Posibilista, which he left to join the royalists. He belonged to the Constituent Assemblies of 1869 and 1873 and that of King Amadeo. He was Ambassador to Paris, senator and Minister on several occasions. He was Foreign Minister during the presidency of Práxedes Mateo Sagasta, and promoted a series of administrative reforms in order to attract moderate Cubans. He was also minister of state under President Francisco Silvela. He was Minister of State under Maura.

Upon the triumph of the 1868 revolution and having resided for some time in the province of Alicante, Buenaventura was elected Deputy for the District of Alcoi for the 1869 Constituent Assembly and then for the district of Villajoyosa for the 1873 Constituent Assembly. During the Restoration he belonged to the Board of the Partido Posibilista and was Senator for Huesca and later Senator for life. He was Foreign Minister in 1894 and Minister of State in 1902.

In 1898 Buenaventura de Abarzuza was part of a delegation sent to negotiate the Treaty of Paris after the Cuban war. He was among those who signed the treaty in Paris by which Spain lost its colonies.

== Literary career ==
Buenaventura de Abarzuza wrote in the "La Democracia" newspaper, owned by his friend Castelar's. He also premiered Una historia de amor (Love story), in verse, but this was unsuccessful.

Political offices
Preceded by The Duke of Almodóvar del Río	Minister of State; 6 December 1902 – 20 July 1903	Succeeded by The Count of San Bernardo
