= Marta Rojas =

Cuban journalist and novelist (1928–2021)

- Born: May 17, 1928; Santiago de Cuba
- Died: October 3, 2021 (aged 93); Havana, Cuba
- Occupation(s): Journalist; Historian; Writer
- Years active: 1953–2021

Marta Rojas (May 17, 1928 – October 3, 2021) was a Cuban journalist, historian, historical fiction writer, and revolutionary heroine. A witness to the 26 July 1953 assault on the Moncada Barracks, she reported on the subject of censorship to Revista Bohemia.

== Biography ==
Marta Rojas, a tailor's daughter, was born in Santiago de Cuba, on 17 May 1928 (other sources state 1931). She studied at the Escuela Normal. She considered becoming a physician before changing her mind once she arrived in Havana. She graduated from the Escuela Profesional de Periodismo Manuel Márquez Sterling.

Rojas worked for Revista Bohemia magazine, and after the revolution, also for Verde Olivo and Trabajo. She worked for the newspaper Granma since its founding, covering numerous national and international events, including numerous overseas trips by Fidel Castro. She also served as a war correspondent in Vietnam. Rojas wrote several novels dealing with the founding of the Cuban nation and the struggle of the mestizos since the 18th century. Turning to historical fiction, she published several books, including Moncada, La Generación del Centenario, El juicio del Moncada, Tania la Guerrillera (coauthor) and El que debe vivir (testimonies about Abel Santamaría). In 1992, an extract translated by Jean Stubbs and Pedro Perez Sarduy from Rojas's then unpublished novel, El columpio de Rey Spencer, was included in the anthology Daughters of Africa, edited by Margaret Busby.

She died of a heart attack on 3 October 2021.

== Awards and honours ==
Rojas has received numerous awards, such as Casa de las Americas Prize (1978), the José Martí National Journalism Award (1997), in recognition of her life's work; and the Alejo Carpentier Award (2005).

== Selected works ==
- 1960, Moncada : un juicio insolito
- 1964, La generación del centenario en el Moncada
- 1971, Tania, the unforgettable guerrilla
- 1978, El que debe vivir
- 1996, El columpio de Rey Spencer
- 2007: Holy Lust
