= María Vinyals =

Spanish publicist and essayist

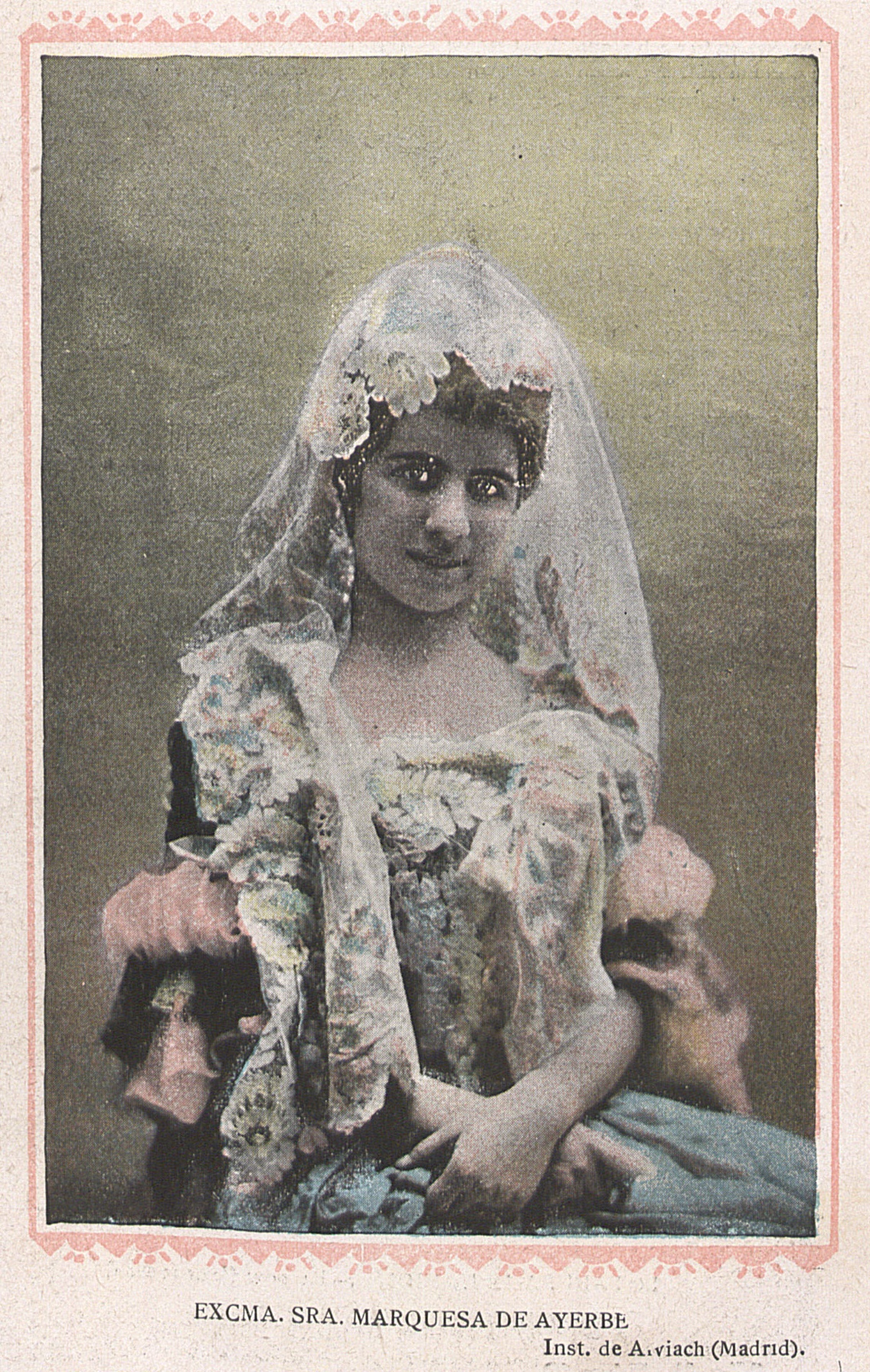
Portrait by Alviach (c. 1899)

María Vinyals y Ferrés (1875–1940s), also known as the Marquise of Ayerbe, was a Spanish publicist and essayist.

== Biography ==
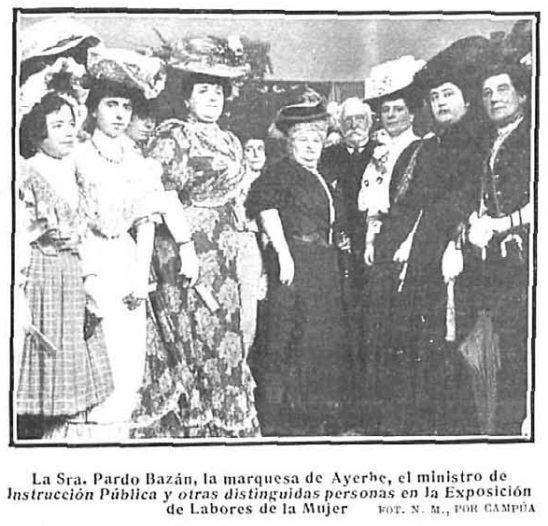
Vinyals portrayed by Campúa in 1907 along Emilia Pardo Bazán and Faustino Rodríguez-San Pedro.

Born in the Castle of Soutomaior, province of Pontevedra, on 14 August 1875. She inherited goods from her uncles the marquises de la Vega y Armijo. She married Juan Jordán de Urríes, marquis of Ayerbe in 1896. In 1904 she published El Castillo del Marqués de Mos en Sotomayor. Vinyals, became an acquaintance of Emilia Pardo Bazán, María Barbeito and Carmen de Burgos, joined the Ateneo de Madrid in 1906. She founded the Ibero-American Centre for Female Popular Culture, an institution looking to teach girls unable to receive other kind of education. In 1909, following the decease of the marquis of Ayerbe, Vinyals married the Cuban physician Enrique Lluria. A member of the Spanish Socialist Workers' Party (PSOE), Vinyals was affiliated to the Female Socialist Aggrupation of Madrid. She wrote several columns in journals such as El Imparcial, El Fígaro, or Blanco y Negro. She dealt with the importance of female education as tool for social regeneration, she also vowed for the complementarity of man and woman in public management.

She moved to Cuba in 1919. She died in Paris during the Nazi occupation of the city in World War II.

== Bibliography ==
- Armesto, Victoria (1969). Galicia feudal. Vol. 1. Vigo: Editorial Galaxia.
- García-Fernández, Miguel; Cernadas Martínez, Silvia; Ballesteros Fernández, Aurora, eds. (2012). As mulleres na historia de Galicia : actas do I Encontro Interdisciplinar de Historia de Xénero. Vol. 2. Santiago de Compostela: Andavira Editora. pp. 41–62. ISBN 978-84-8408-647-5.
- Fernández Vázquez, José Ramón (2004). "Implantación de la escuela mixta e incorporación de la mujer a la educación formalizada en Galicia: proceso histórico" (PDF). Historia de la educación. 22–23. Salamanca: Universidad de Salamanca: 387–404. ISSN 0212-0267.
- Ezama Gil, Ángeles (2012). "Los comienzos periodísticos de una reportera española: las colaboraciones de Josefina Carabias en La Voz (1932-1935)". El Argonauta español. 9. ISSN 1765-2901.
- Moral Vargas, Marta del (2012). "Dicotomías de lo público: Límites y transgresiones del activismo social (1900-1930)". Cuadernos Kóre. Revista de historia y pensamiento de género (6). ISSN 1889-9285.
- Quiles Faz, Amparo (2014). El porvenir de la mujer española: Isabel Oyárzabal y El Día de Madrid (1916-1917). Vol. 1. Alicante: Biblioteca Virtual Miguel de Cervantes. pp. 34–49. ISBN 978-84-616-6732-1.
