= Gregorio de Laferrère =

Argentine politician and playwright (1867–1913)

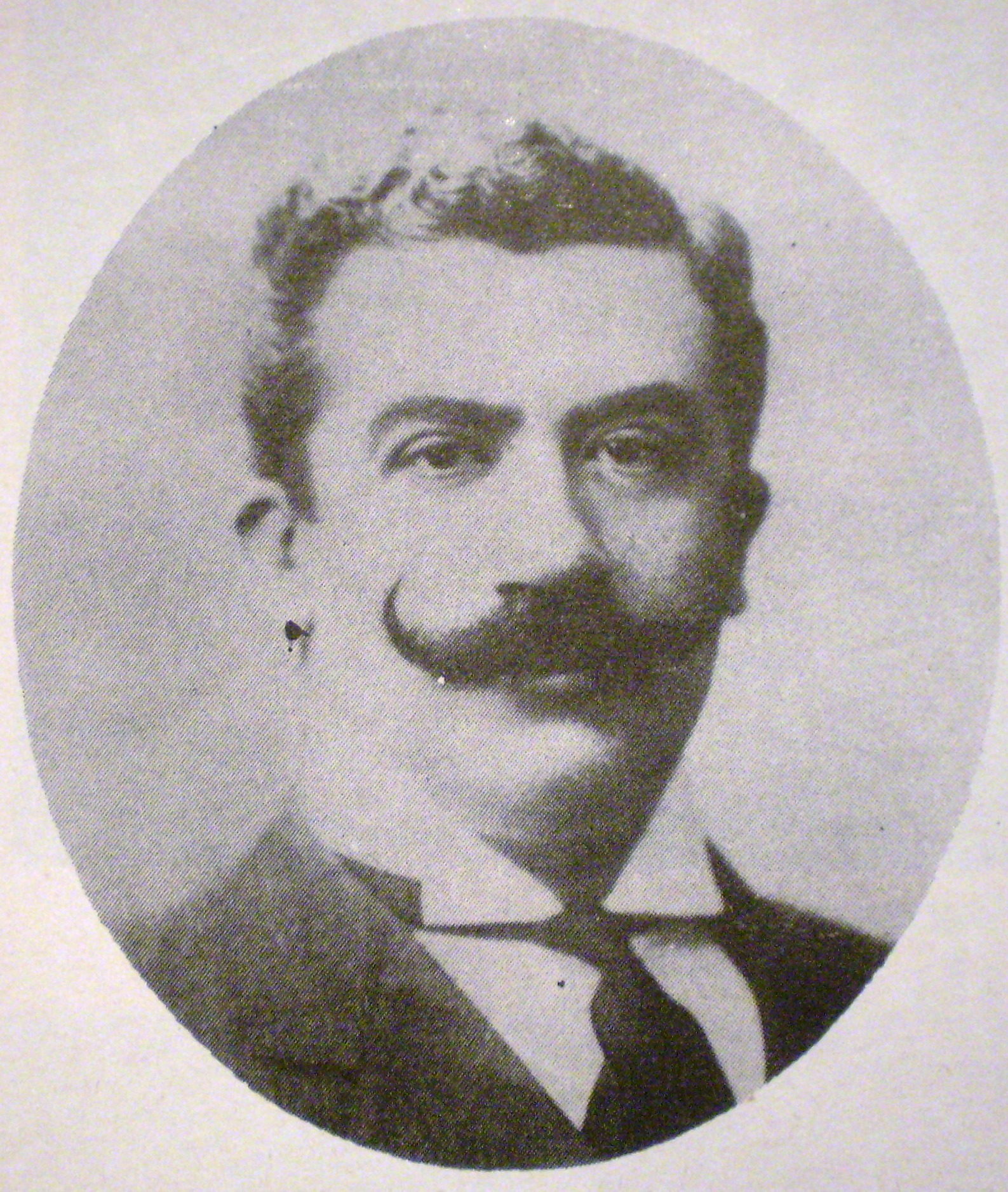
Gregorio de Laferrère

Gregorio de Laferrère (March 8, 1867 — November 30, 1913) was an Argentine politician and playwright.

== Life and work ==
Gregorio de Laferrère was born in Buenos Aires to Mercedes Pereda, a local heiress, and Alfonso de Laferrère, a prominent French Argentine landowner. One of three brothers, he earned his secondary school education at the Colegio Nacional de Buenos Aires. He began a career in journalism, and wrote for the satirical El Fígaro briefly under the pseudonym of "Abel Stewart Escalada." Joining his family for a visit to Paris on the occasion of the 1889 World's Fair, he lost his father to a sudden illness while in the French capital; there, however, he became acquainted with the theatre after attending a number of performances of Molière's works by the Comédie-Française.

Returning to Argentina, he joined a friend, writer José María Miró, as an active member of the ruling National Autonomist Party, and in 1891, was elected the first Mayor of Morón, a newly established town west of Buenos Aires; taking office after a heated campaign, he reportedly arrived at City Hall for his inaugural in disguise. He resigned his post in 1892, and approached the new leader of the Radical Civic Union, universal male suffrage activist Hipólito Yrigoyen, in search of alliance that ultimately did not materialize. He was elected on the centrist National Party ticket to the Buenos Aires Province Legislature in 1893, and in 1897, established the splinter Independent National Party; on this latter ticket, Laferrère was elected to the Lower House of Congress in 1898.

Reelected in 1902, the following year he established the "Popular Association," advocating direct democracy. Laferrère relied on his membership in the elite Officers' Association, by virtue of his family ties, to organize a public forum facing the institution's palatial headquarters, where he held forth almost daily, and heard appeals, both personal and of a policy nature, from the city's poor.

Laferrère had, from an early age, written as a hobby, without having published his work. Long a patron of the former San Martín Theatre on Buenos Aires' downtown Esmeralda Street, he first had a play, ¡Jettatore! ("Evil Eye"), staged in 1904. The slice of life comedy, written in a vaudeville format, included President Julio Roca among its audience during its May 30 premiere, and went on to become a box office success. He was reunited with the prestigious Jerónimo Podestá Theatre Company for the May 6, 1905, premiere of his second play, Locos de verano ("Summer Madness"). The satire on prevailing social mores was also successful, and ran for eighty consecutive showings (unusual for the time in the local theatre).

Following the 1906 production of Bajo la garra ("Into the Clutches"), a tragedy dealing with the consequences of malicious gossip, Laferrère secured congressional funding for the Lavardén Dramatic Conservatory, the first of its type in Argentina. The group produced his fourth and most successful play, Las de Barranco ("Barranco's Girls"), which premiered on April 24, 1908. The play, a work of social criticism dealing with a military officer's death and his nearly destitute widow's efforts to marry her three daughters off to moneyed bachelors, ran for 146 performances, and in 1921, was staged for a Paris revival.

Immersed in his work, the noted playwright retired from Congress in 1908, and in 1911, produced Los invisibles with Pablo Podestá's company. The comedy, centered on an otherwise ordinary shopkeeper's sudden obsession with ghosts, was less successful than its predecessors, however. He joined Honorio Luque and Dr. Pedro Luro (who had earlier developed what became the Villa Luro section of Buenos Aires) in a real estate venture southwest of the rapidly growing capital in 1911. The location capitalized on the imminent arrival of the Buenos Aires and Pacific Railway line, and was a modest success in its early years.

== Death ==
Following a brief illness, however, Gregorio de Laferrère died in Buenos Aires in 1913, at age 46. His business partners subsequently renamed the new settlement in his honor.
