= Manuel de Mariátegui, 1st Count of San Bernardo =

Spanish noble and politician

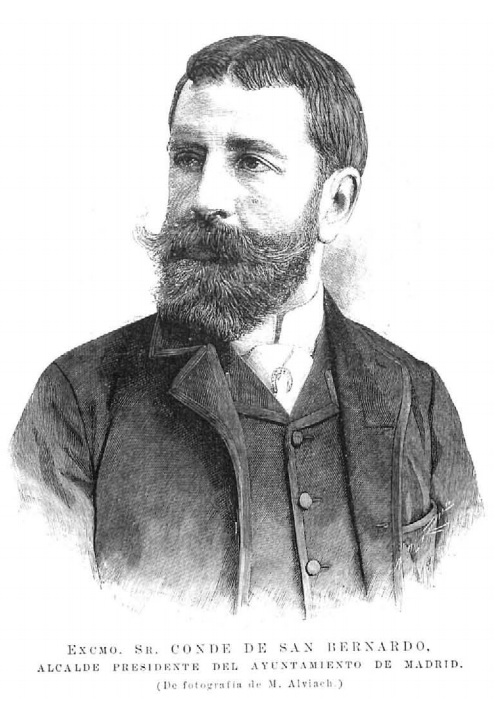
The Count of San Bernardo

Don Manuel de Mariátegui y Vinyals, 1st Count of San Bernardo (24 May 1842 in Madrid – 28 January 1905) was a Spanish noble and politician who served as Mayor of Madrid between 1892 and 1894 and as Minister of State in 1903. He married María del Rosario Pérez de Barradas, 13th Marquise of Peñaflor and had five children.

Political offices
Preceded by Buenaventura de Abarzuza	Minister of State; 20 July 1903 – 5 December 1903	Succeeded by Faustino Rodríguez-San Pedro
