= Miguel Ángel Quevedo =

Cuban journalist (1908–1969)

Miguel Ángel Quevedo y de la Lastra
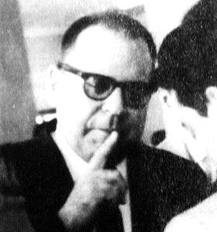
- Born: July 31, 1908; Havana, Cuba
- Died: August 12, 1969 (aged 61); Caracas, Venezuela
- Cause of death: Suicide by gunshot
- Other name: Miguelito
- Education: University of Havana
- Occupations: Publisher and editor
- Years active: 1927-1969
- Notable work: Bohemia; Bohemia Libre
- Awards: Pulitzer Prize; Maria Moors Cabot Prize; Mergenthaler Award

Miguel Ángel Quevedo y de la Lastra (July 31, 1908 – August 12, 1969) was the publisher and editor of Bohemia, the most popular news-weekly in Cuba and the oldest Latin America, known for its political journalism and editorial writing.

== Early life ==
Quevedo was born in 1908 - the same year as the first short-run issue of Bohemia. His father was Miguel Ángel Quevedo y Pérez, founder of that magazine.

Quevedo attended the Belén School and was classmates with Eddy Chibás.

Quevedo studied at the University of Havana.

=== Boy Scouts in Cuba ===
Quevedo was 6 years old when his father advocated for the creation of a Cuban scouting movement in Bohemia. The Cuban Scouting Movement was founded in the lobby of Bohemia on February 20, 1914. This movement was dissolved in 1930 after having suffered an unfortunate period of its troops devolving into juvenile paramilitary militias. After a period of revolutionary wars in Cuba, it was reestablished as the Asociación de Scouts de Cuba.

== Career at Bohemia ==
On January 1, 1927, due to his father's failing health, when he was eighteen years old, Quevedo Pérez assumed the responsibilities of running Bohemia.

On November 14, 1929, Quevedo's father died having been unable to recover from his illness. On the first anniversary of his death, Quevedo and the editorial staff of Bohemia gave him a tribute.

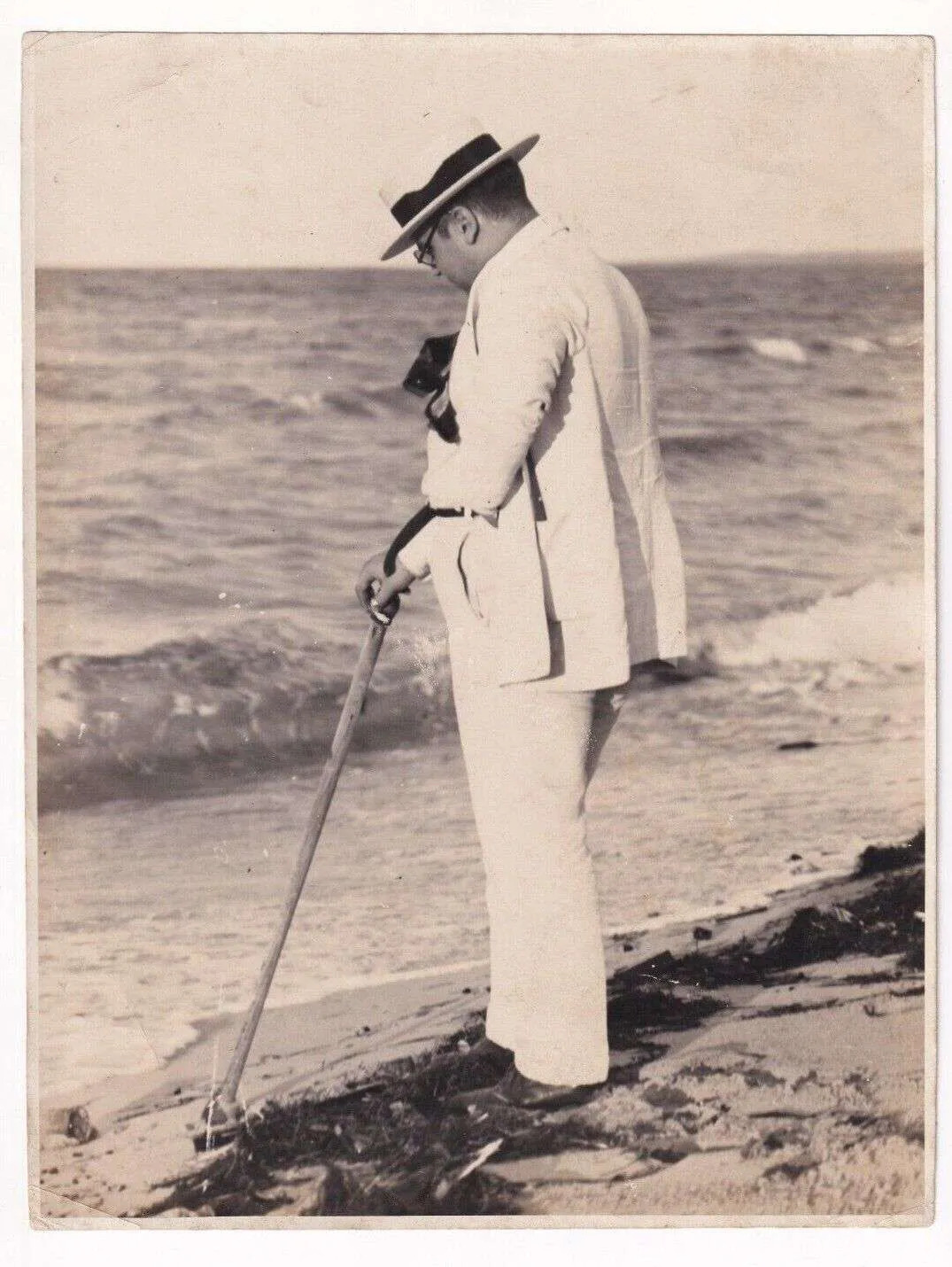
Quevedo seen here in the 40's, poking the sand with a stick.

Almost immediately, Quevedo became one of the principle voices of opposition to the dictatorship of Gerardo Machado, a distinction for which he was jailed several times in the early 1930s.

After the Cuban Revolution of 1933, Quevedo also became a vocal critic of the myriad dictatorships that gripped Latin America in the 1930s and 1940s - Ramón Grau, Fulgencio Batista, and others.

In 1944, when Bohemia investigated an event that occurred at the house of President Ramón Grau, the President called Quevedo and challenged him to a duel. Quevedo declined.

During the reign of Batista, the President ordered his men to abduct Quevedo from his home in the middle of the night. They brought him to the Lagüito and tortured him. They forced him to drink a liter of castor oil (Spanish: palmacristi), in a practice that Cubans called Palmacristazo. Quevedo suffered stomach problems for the rest of his life.

In 1953, Quevedo purchased Bohemia's strongest competing magazines, Carteles and Vanidades.

After Fulgencio Batista returned to power in his second coup against Carlos Prío Socarrás, Quevedo and Bohemia led the mainstream Cuban press in denouncing the dictatorship of Batista and supported the insurrection and revolution against Batista's regime.

On July 26, 1958 the magazine published the Sierra Maestra Manifesto, a document that purported to unify the opposition groups fighting Batista. On January 11, 1959, one million copies of a special edition of the magazine were printed, and sold out in just a few hours.

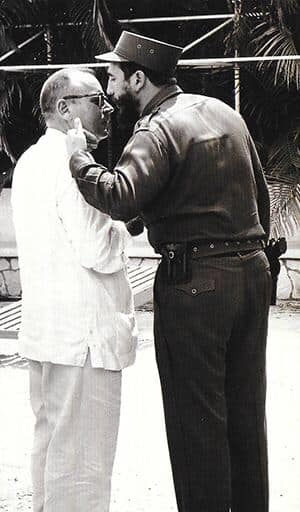
Fidel Castro explaining things to Quevedo in 1959.

Fidel Castro and Quevedo soon began to disagree on the nature of the revolution.

== Exile ==
On July 17, 1960, Quevedo called in the employees of Bohemia to the headquarters, where he announced that he was going into exile. Quevedo sought political asylum in the Venezuelan embassy in Havana in the summer of 1960 and arrived in Miami on September 7, 1960.

In October 1960, Quevedo went to New York City, where he gathered talent and partners for a version of his publication to be published in exile, Bohemia Libre. He published Bohemia Libre with $40,000 monthly from the U.S. State Department until after the failed Bay of Pigs invasion in April 1961.

After the CIA realized the futility of sponsoring Bohemia Libre, they cancelled US government funding. The magazine continued to be published, and also published an international edition called Bohemia Libre International and subsequently edited and published in Miami, San Juan, Puerto Rico, and Caracas, and ran until 1969.

On August 12, 1969, weeks after his publication went bankrupt and he was heavily indebted to loan sharks and had cashed large checks without funds, the inveterate bachelor committed suicide, at age 61, in the Caracas apartment that he shared with his sister Rosa Margarita Quevedo. He shot himself in the right temple with a .38-caliber revolver.

Next to his body was found a letter to "the competent authorities and to public opinion" saying that "absolutely no one should be blamed for his death." He "begged forgiveness from anyone he may have offended in any way." Another letter was addressed to his sister, who heard the gunshot in his bedroom while she was in the kitchen.

== Scandal surrounding fake apology letter ==
In 1969, the Miami Herald published a suicide letter from Quevedo supposedly sent to journalist Ernesto Morando, apologizing for his role in bringing Fidel Castro's regime to power.

In this letter, Quevedo appears to have written:

"Bohemia was nothing more than an echo of the street. That street contaminated by hatred that applauded Bohemia when it invented "the twenty thousand dead." [This was a] Diabolical invention of the dipsomaniac Enriquito de la Osa, who knew that Bohemia was an echo of the street, but that the street also echoed what Bohemia published."

However, Journalists Agustín Tamargo and Carlos Castañeda (both former Bohemia writers) believed this letter was a fraud, and denounced its authenticity. Soon, the journalism community came to the consensus that the letter sent to Ernesto Morando was a forgery.

In an interview with CiberCuba, Lilian Castañeda said:

"He was not sorry for anything, not for his political position, not for his beliefs, not for anything like that. Miguel would never have written that letter."

The journalist Wilfredo Cancio Island wrote in 2020:

"This is not the only one of the pseudo-myths that have marked numerous episodes of national history, on the island and in the diaspora. But the responsibility of historical memory, which is always the best antidote to oblivion, is to pave the way to the strictest truth for Cubans of the present and the future. Not a single lie is needed to denounce the iniquities of our national history or to be proud of what we are."
