= Patria (newspaper) =

Cuban newspaper

Patria's first issue appeared on March 14, 1892. Writer José Martí played a leading role in founding the paper as the official publication of the Cuban Revolutionary Party. It provided a method of spreading information that could be accessible to Cubans about the Cuban War of Independence.

== Background ==
=== Cuban War of Independence ===
The Cuban War of Independence came seventeen years after the end of the unsuccessful Ten Years War, also considered the first war of Cuban Independence. As a result of that war there was a rise in political corruption, high taxes for Cuba's citizens, and lack of political representation. While exiled in New York, Martí worked with Máximo Gómez, who had been a Major General of the Ten Years' War, to build a coalition that ultimately led to the invasion of Cuba from the Eastern region in 1895, which quickly spread and led to the conquering of parts of the Western region. Many of the people involved with the invasion included individuals from the Dominican Republic, Puerto Ricans, Mexicans, and Colombians. A month into the War, José Martí was killed and made martyr of the people.

=== Cuban Revolutionary Party ===
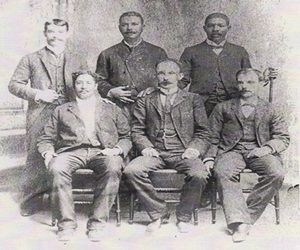
Cuban Revolutionary Party

The Cuban Revolutionary Party was formed to organize another movement for an independent Cuba. Most members were male figures involved in the Ten Years War. There was a mentality that the men who should be included in the party should have a background in army combat. Martí, who did not have military experience, refused to be called President of the party, so he was given the name of Delegado. Three years before the Cuban War of Independence, Máximo Gómez was put in charge of the Party, and later led the invasion of Cuba in 1895. Because of his military leadership, Gómez was believed to provide a well-rounded perspective to the movement and to know how to portray a steady government instead of a colonial era situation.

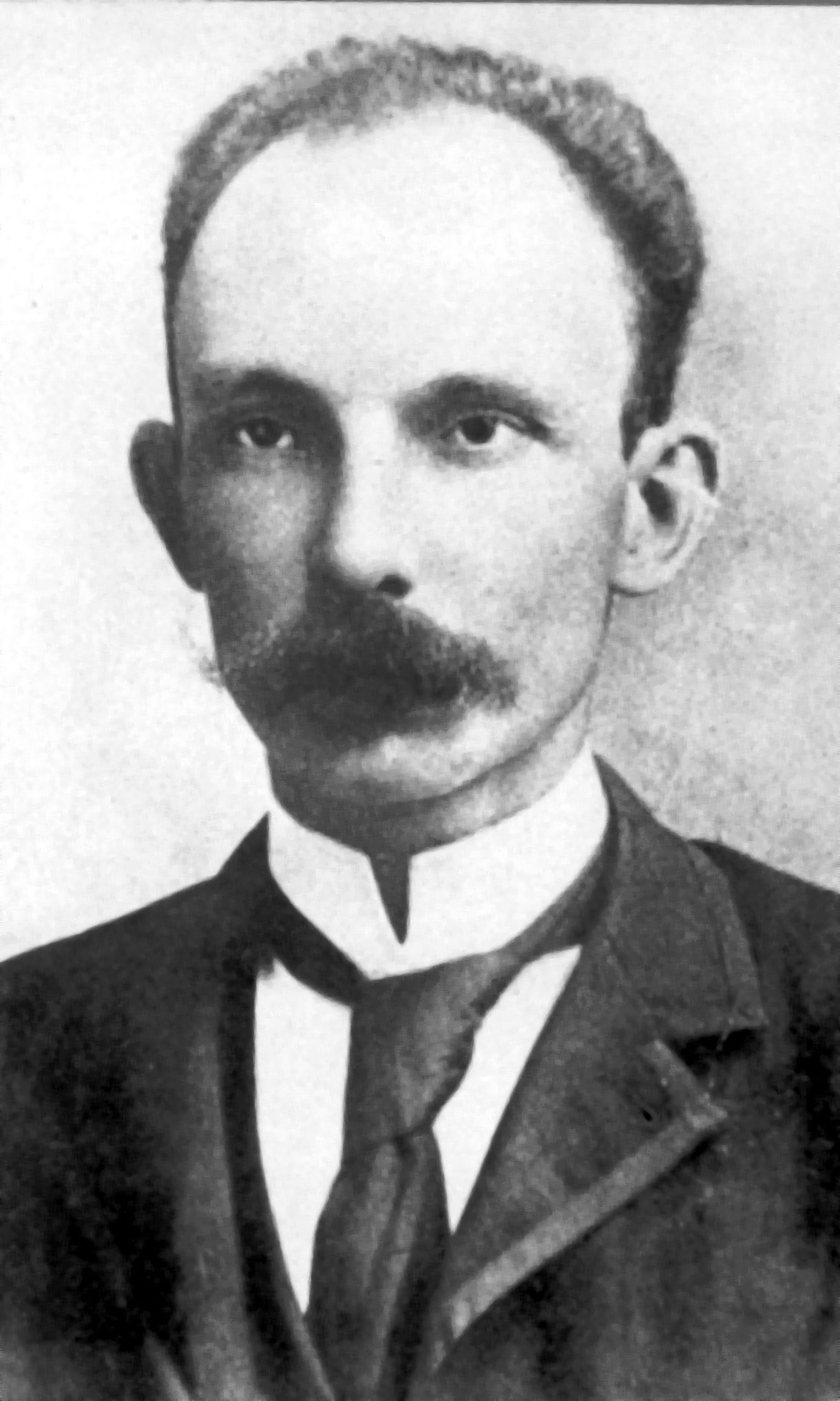
José Martí, Founder of Patria

== Organization ==
Patria was distributed on a weekly basis. Its content was formatted in long pages measuring 56×36 cm, approximately 22×14 in. The newspaper was designed with four columns per page with a total of four pages in each issue. Patria was founded in New York and was distributed to people in Cuba. Due to the concepts and ideas that it presented it can be considered press that infiltrated into Cuba to provide information, in other words it can be explained as exile press. The reason for Patria being referred to as exile press was because its printing or place of creation was not in Cuba but rather in the United States where freedom of speech is allowed.

== Main objective ==
In the first issue released on March 14, 1892, Patria clearly states its purpose for being and the influences it aspired to have on its audience of Cuba and Puerto Rico. The author José Martí wrote of the content of the newspaper: “En Patria publicaremos "La situación política," que refleje de adentro y de afuera cuanto cubanos y puertorriqueños necesitan saber del país; los "Héroes," que nos pintaran los que no se ha cansado de serlo; "Carácteres" de nuestro pueblo, de lo más pobre como de lo más dichoso de la vida, para que no caiga la fe de olvidadizos; la "Guerra" o crónica de ella en relación una veces en anécdotas otras, por donde a chispazos se vea nuestro poder en la dificultad y en nuestra firmeza en la desdicha; la "Cartilla Revolucionaria," donde se enseñara desde el zapato hasta caer muerto el arte de pelear por la independencia del país: a vestirse, a calzarse, a curarse, a fabricar capsulas y pólvora, a remendar las armas. Contará Patria los trabajos y los méritos de los puertorriqueños y la vida social de los ricos y de los pobres. Se verá la fuerza entera del país en sus páginas.”

Martí reiterated the goals of Patria throughout the various issues that were published in order to encourage its readers to take action on the topics that were being presented. On April 23, 1892, an issue of Patria was released in which a section titled “De un rincón de Cuba” called to the people of Cuba to grow and demonstrate to those in Spain that they are united. Patria referred to this being its cause for existing, it wanted to revive the mood that had long been lost in its community due to fear.

== Social impact ==
Patria served as a means of communicating to people living in Cuba about the political situation developing. In the moments leading up to the Cuban Revolution, Patria became a guide for the rise of this revolution through the ideas and information provided by its author and contributors.

In a section of the issue released on May 7, 1892 entitled “ Época de corazones”, the newspapers' editors announced that they would be sharing the opinions of those individuals who had expressed their thoughts to the editorial team through letters. The section explained the types of letters that would be chosen to be a part of an issue of Patria were the letters of people who were often oppressed and whose opinions were deemed invaluable. In this way, the newspaper provided a platform for ideas and for communication that would allow the community that was forming to continue to grow. In essence, the newspaper was becoming the voice of its people. As Laura Lomas writes in Translating Empire, " The columns of Patria provided the vehicle through which a vision of an alternative modernity developed in the tobacco workshops and Latino/a migrant communities that made the revolution possible by funding it and by sending people to fight in it. In the space between these columns and pages, the fold along the center invites reflection, notes, conversation, and debate among the working masses that funded and fought for this revolution."

Patria sought to cover various topics during a time of uncertainty and change in the country of its readers. It focused on uniting the people of Cuba and those still connected from the outside by paving the way for a new wave of change, a revolution of liberty.

Sotero Figueroa was a key editor for the paper who allowed a conversation about race to initiate.

== See also ==
- José Martí
- Sotero Figueroa
