= El Fígaro =

Defunct Cuban magazine

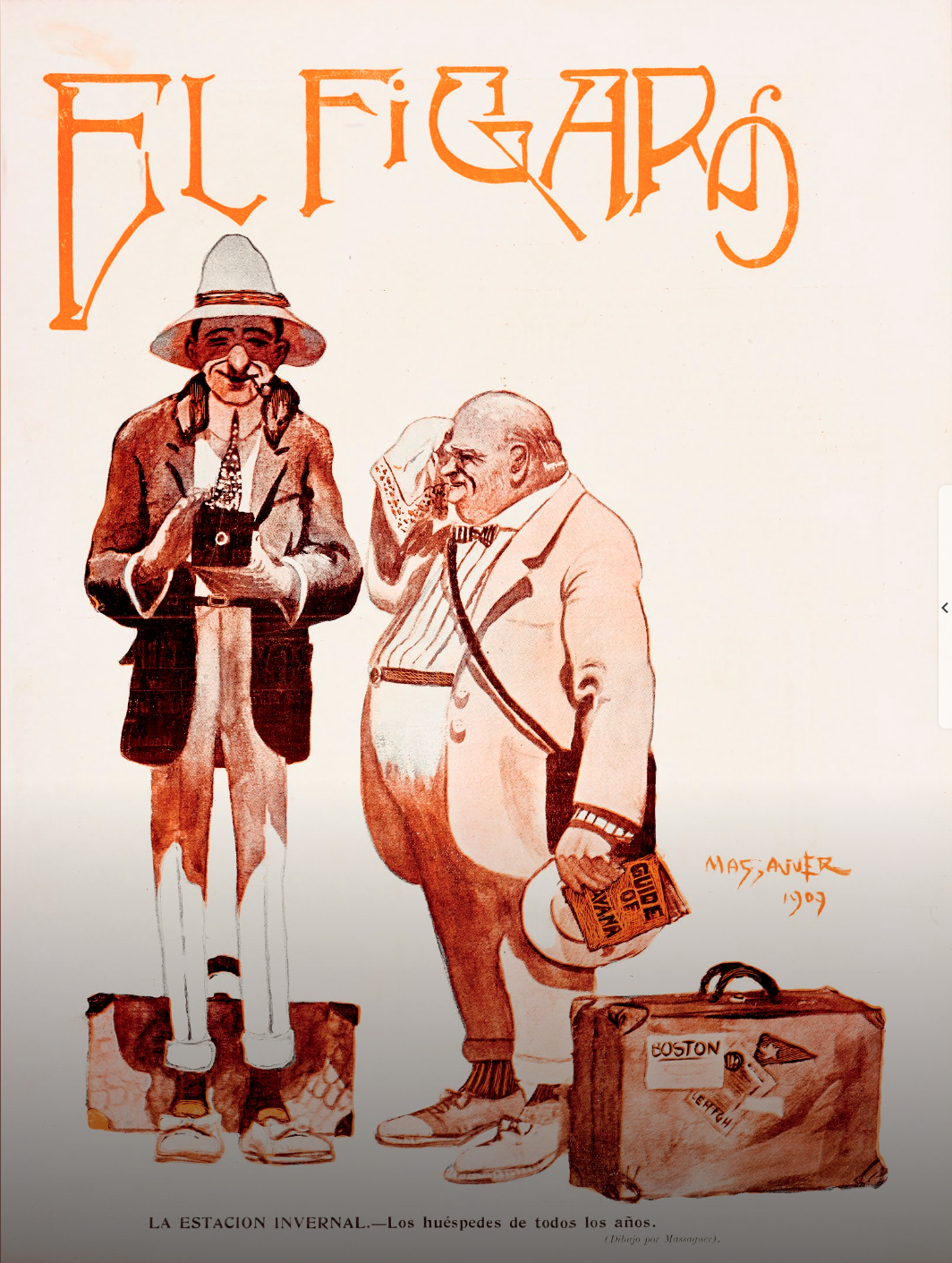
Cover of El Fígaro, drawn by Conrado Walter Massaguer in 1909, depicting American tourists to Cuba.

El Fígaro was a Cuban magazine published in Havana from 1885 to 1929, with irregular publications continuing until 1933. It began as a sports magazine, but evolved into a more general interest consumer magazine and became "the driving force of the Cuban press and of national culture." El Fígaro included sections on theatre, literature, music, and current affairs. Many of Cuba's early revolutionary writers, poets, painters, artists, journalists, and activists contributed to this magazine.

The National Library of Cuba writes of El Fígaro:

"Without a doubt, El Fígaro is among the most representative periodical publications of the 19th century in Cuba. Its content and illustrations are a reflection of our culture and show the development of the press in the largest of the Antilles, a luxury magazine that, over time, its almost obligatory consultation brings us extraordinary results."

== History ==
On July 23, 1885, El Fígaro was founded by Rafael Bárzaga, Manuel Serafín Pichardo, Ramón A. Catalá, Crescencio Sacerio. Its first issue, and several issues that followed, primarily covered baseball and baseball in Cuba, with the editors writing in the first issue that they were “dedicated to defending the interests of sport in general and especially those of the game of baseball, which has so many fans.”

On September 2, 1886, the mission and purpose of the magazine expanded to cover literature and the arts.

== Notable people ==
=== Contributors ===
- Juana Borrero
- Julian del Casal
- Carlos Pio
- Federico Pio
- Ruben Dario
- Manuel Sanguily
- Enrique Jose Varona
- Justo de Lara
- Conrado Walter Massaguer
- Emilio Roig de Leuchsenring
- Manuel Maria Mustelier
- Vicente Acosta
- Isabel Margarita Ordetx
- Agustín Acosta Bello
- José Manuel Acosta Bello
- Gregorio de Laferrère
- Miguel Ángel Quevedo Pérez
- Mariano Brull
- Sarah Méndez Capote
- Sotero Figueroa
- María Vinyals
- Félix B. Caignet
- José Gómez de la Carrera
- Rafael Santa Coloma
- Santiago Quiñones
- Sebastián Gelabert

=== Editors ===
- Rafael Bárzaga (1885 – 1909)
- Manuel Serafín Pichardo (1887 – 1915)
- Ramón A. Catalá (1909 – 1929)
