= Faustino Rodríguez-San Pedro =

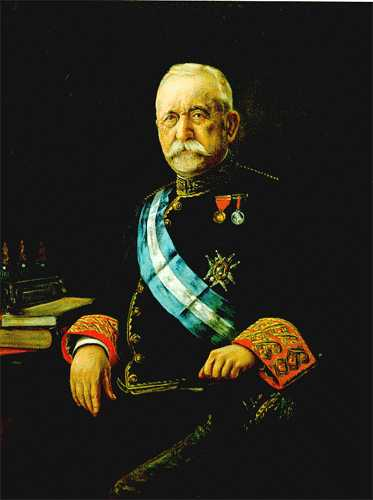
Faustino Rodríguez-San Pedro

Faustino Rodríguez-San Pedro y Díaz-Argüelles (1833, in Gijón – 1925) was Mayor of Madrid from 1890 to 1891, a deputy in the Spanish National Congress for both Alicante and Cuba, a senator for life in the Senate of Spain, and then a political minister in the governments of Francisco Silvela and Antonio Maura. He was a lawyer who joined the Conservative party at that time. He is the great grandfather of former Spanish politician and former IMF chief Rodrigo Rato.

Political offices
| Preceded by The Count of San Bernardo | Minister of State; 5 December 1903 – 16 December 1904 | Succeeded by The Marquis of Aguilar de Campoo |
