= Vanidades =

- Special issue of Vanidades, covering the wedding of the Prince of Asturias, Felipe de Borbón (July 10, 2004).
- Categories: women's magazine
- Frequency: Monthly
- Total circulation: 500,000 (US) (2017)
- First issue: 1937
- Company: Editorial Televisa
- Country: Mexico
- Language: Spanish
- ISSN: 1665-7519

Vanidades (Spanish for Vanities) is one of the most popular Spanish language women's magazines. Published by Editorial Televisa across the United States and Hispanic America, it was launched in Cuba in February 1937 by Editorial Carteles S.A. When Fidel Castro rose to power, Vanidades' headquarters moved from Havana to New York. Later, in 1961, Vanidades was relaunched as Nueva Vanidades and eventually as Vanidades Continental.

The magazine in its beginnings was aimed at women of high class, addressing them in a friendly manner and serving as a guide to help them keep up with the trends in fashion, culture, arts, health and beauty. To guarantee its market success, the magazine is edited locally in some cases, blending national preferences with international trends and always following its traditionally classical style.

The main headquarters of Vanidades are now located in Mexico. However, localized editions are released simultaneously in Argentina, Chile, Bolivia, Colombia, Ecuador, Peru, Brazil, the United States, Puerto Rico and the Dominican Republic.

Vanidades magazine stopped circulating in Colombia, Peru, Ecuador, Chile and Argentina due to the closure of Editorial Televisa in those countries between January and February 2019. It was also distributed in Venezuela through the Bloque Dearmas, but it stopped being published due to the socioeconomic crisis in that country.

Vanidades magazine is once again published in print and digital in Chile by Alfa Editores SA, on Tuesday, April 4, 2023 after 4 years of silence.
