= Cuba during World War I =

The Republic of Cuba had maintained neutrality during much of World War I until German submarine warfare resumed on February 1, 1917. On April 7, one day after the United States entered the war, Cuba declared war on Germany and began to support the Allied war effort. Cuba also declared war on Austria-Hungary later that year, on December 16.

A draft law was enacted, and 25,000 soldiers were ready for shipment to France when the armistice intervened. A hospital unit of 100 Cuban doctors and nurses was equipped and sent to the Western Front (World War I).

== Background ==
Mario Garcia Menocal (December 17, 1866 - September 7, 1941) served as President of Cuba from 1913 until 1921. Supported by the US and an economic boom, he maintained his office when World War I broke out. President Woodrow Wilson and the USA entered the war on April 6, 1917. With strong ties to its neighbors and put under pressure by New York Times reports of German U-boats resupplying in Cuba, they later followed suit and declared war on April 7.

== Entering World War I ==
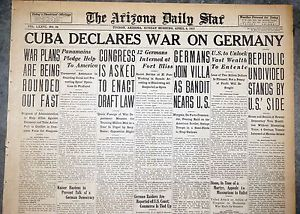
The Arizona Daily Star - Cuba declares war on Germany on Friday 7 April 1917.

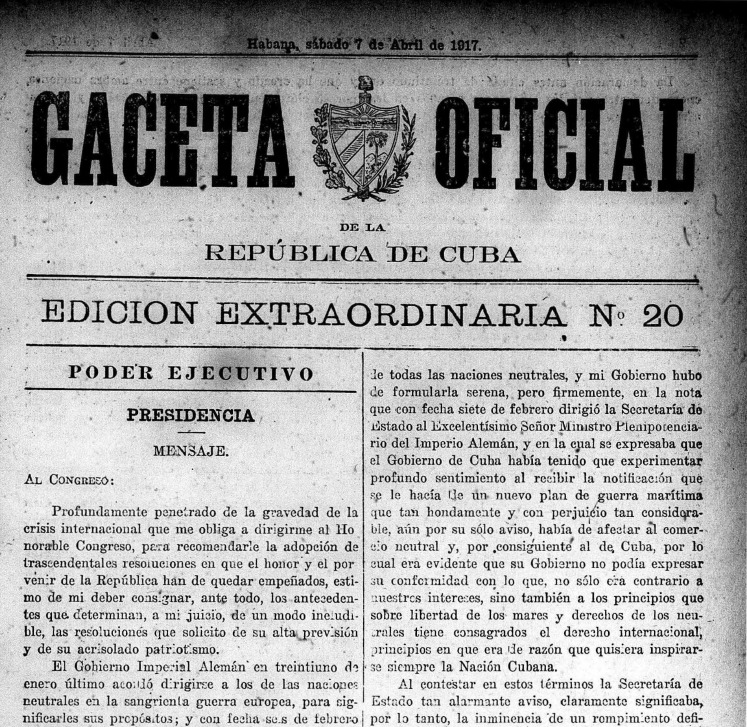
Original Spanish newspaper in 1917.

Because of the total submarine warfare declared by Germany and the continued sinking of ships of different neutral nationalities on the American shores, Brazil and Cuba had sent angry protest to the Germans. President Menocal, encouraged by the United States` entry into the war, asked the congress of Cuba to declare war as well, enthusiastically stating that Cuba could not remain neutral. The Cuban senate unanimously passed a resolution that a state of war existed against Germany and the Cuban congress approved the declaration of war on April 7, 1917.

Thus Cuba was one of the few Latin American countries, along with Panama, Bolivia and Uruguay, who joined the Allies of World War I. Most countries in the region, including Mexico, maintained their neutral position.

== War effort on Cuba ==
After the declaration of war all German ships within Havana Harbor were seized, and Cuban ports were opened to Allied warships. A bill was being drafted to authorize the offering of a contingent of 12,000 men to the United States.

Internal politics were strengthened by the declaration as liberals, who agreed with the move, decided to stop criticizing the government. In July 1917, the Menocal government suspended constitutional guarantees with the measure being claimed to be intended against German spies.

The Cuban government also agreed to the stationing of U.S. Marines on the island. However the Americans, afraid that this would undermine the national and international position of the Menocal government, announced that the goal of the intervention was to support the sugar harvest as major war contribution of Cuba, thus becoming known as Sugar Intervention.

The Cuban Red Cross was also reorganized, as it further established operations in Europe and supported the Allied forces on the Western Front. In 1919, an additional 25 female Cuban nurses were sent to London to help the Voluntary Aid Detachments effort.

== War on Austria-Hungary ==
The United States declaration of war on Austria-Hungary came on December 7, 1917, and Panama followed on December 10, 1917. Cuba would do the same on December 16. From WW1, Cuba was given some recognition for their efforts in the form of donations from America, however, they lost money overall.

== Recognition of Mexican government ==
In the midst of the diplomatic crisis, caused by the disappearance of the diplomatic baggage of Mexican Ambassador Isidro Fabela, the government of Cuba officially acknowledged the Constitutionalist government of Venustiano Carranza. Federico Jimenez O'Farril presented a handwritten letter of the Cuban president to the Mexican president in which he granted recognition.

Despite that diplomatic act, the relationship between the two countries cooled because of the treatment of the Mexican travelers in Havana.

== See also ==
- Cuba during World War II
