= Military history of Cuba =

The military history of Cuba is an aspect of the history of Cuba that spans several hundred years and encompasses the armed actions of Spanish Cuba while it was part of the Spanish Empire and the succeeding Cuban republics.

From the 16th to 18th century, organized militia companies made up the bulk of Cuba's armed forces. These forces helped maintain the territorial integrity of Spanish Cuba, and later, assisted the Spanish Army in its expeditionary action throughout North America. These forces were later supplanted by Spanish regulars in the 19th century, with Cuba being used as a major base of operations for Spain during the Spanish American wars of independence.

The latter half of the 19th century saw three Cuban wars of independence launched against the Spanish colonial government. The final conflict for independence escalated to the Spanish–American War and resulted in the American occupation of Cuba from 1898 to 1902.

After the Cuban Revolution in 1959 and communist takeover by Fidel Castro, Cuba became involved in several Cold War conflicts in Africa and the Middle East, where it supported Marxist governments and fought against Western proxies. Castro's Cuba had some 39,000–40,000 military personnel abroad by the late 1970s, with the bulk of the forces in Sub-Saharan Africa but with some 1,365 stationed in the Middle East and North Africa. Cuban forces in Africa were mainly black and mulatto (mixed-race Spanish/African). The loss of East European subsidies at the end of the Cold War weakened the Cuban Revolutionary Armed Forces.

== 16th and 17th centuries ==
Owing to its strategic location along the Europe–Americas trade route, Spanish Cuba served as a crucial gateway to the Caribbean. Consequently, Cuba faced attacks from Spain's major colonial rivals to seize the "gateway", with attempts to seize control intensifying from the mid-16th century onward. In addition to other colonial rivals, the relatively undefended coastline resulted in privateers and pirates to raid the colony as well.

Spanish territories in the Caribbean, including Cuba, relied on private individuals to preserve the internal peace and defend the colony's territorial integrity. These individuals initially came from privately financed conquistador armies, followed by organizations of volunteer troops and locally organized militia companies among the settlers at the end of the 16th century. Recognizing the vital role played by volunteer civilian militias in safeguarding its colonies, Spanish authorities in Cuba went out of their way to guarantee free white colonists and the free Black and multiracial population the right to bear arms. The first formal militia companies were organized in 1586, responding to the threat against English privateers. From the 16th to the end of the 18th century, organized civilian militias formed the bulk of the Spanish Empire's fighting force in Cuba, with the number of permanent militia companies in Cuba having increased in the late 17th century to match the number of attacks on the colony.

=== Taíno resistance against Spanish colonial rule ===
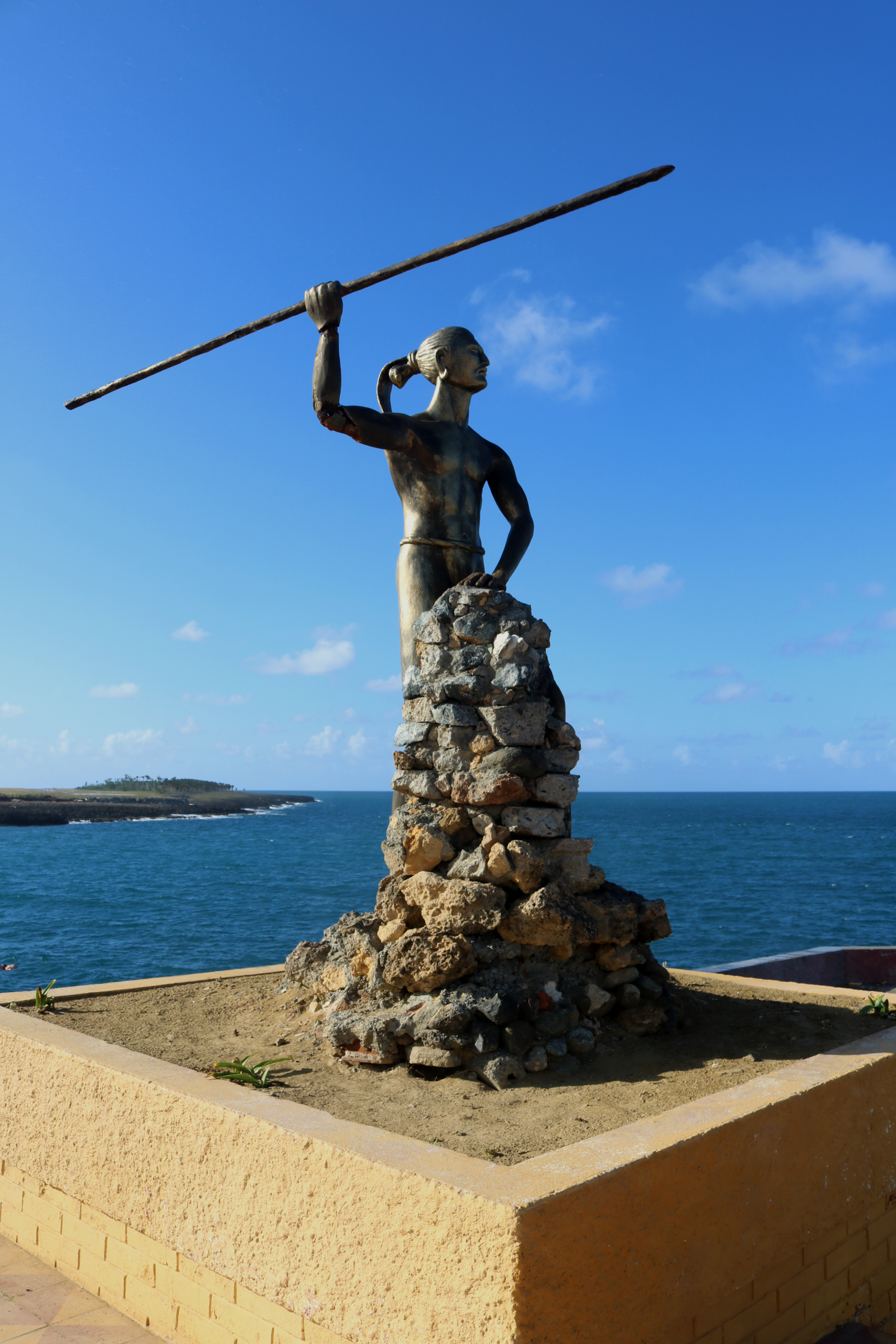
A statue of Hatuey, a Taíno cacique who fought against Spanish rule, in Baracoa, Cuba.

Several Taíno caciques (chiefs) led resistance movements against Spanish colonial rule in the early 16th century. The first major Taíno resistance in the Caribbean against Spanish-rule culminated in Cuba after Hatuey, a cacique who had led a revolt on Hispaniola since 1502, expanded his efforts to Cuba. In 1511, he and 400 followers set out for Cuba by canoe, seeking to rally the island's Taíno against the Spanish. Hatuey led a guerrilla campaign that kept the Spanish confined to their fort at Baracoa for three months before being overwhelmed by a Spanish counteroffensive. Hatuey was captured and executed in February 1512. Other notable Taíno resistances includes one led by Guamá in the 1530s.

=== Slave revolts ===
The first revolt by enslaved Black people in Cuba was the Jobabó Slave Revolt in 1532, which occurred at a gold mine in Jobabo. The rebellion was quickly suppressed, and the heads of the leaders were placed on stakes outside the town. A subsequent slave rebellion took place in 1538.

Fears of further slave rebellions among White Cubans led to several massacres against Afro-Cubans in response to real and alleged revolts and conspiracies, including those in 1792, 1793, 1795, 1814, 1844, and 1912.

=== Italian Wars ===
During the Italian Wars, the broader French–Habsburg rivalry extended to the Caribbean, where French corsairs raided Spanish Cuban settlements.

==== Italian War of 1536–1538 ====
Following the outbreak of hostilities between France and Spain in 1536, Francis I, King of France, quickly dispatched corsairs to intercept Spanish shipping. However, intercepting the Spanish treasure fleet in the open sea proved incredibly difficult. As a result, Havana became a target, as it served as a stationary hub where the Spanish stored their gold before the convoys' departure; and because the city lacked significant defenses, as an attack was thought to be unlikely.

The first corsair attack on Havana occurred in March 1537 when a French ship entered Havana's harbour on a reconnaissance mission before sailing west. Three Spanish vessels in port gave chase and caught up to the corsair, but a sudden shift in the wind ran them aground. Recognizing that Havana was now defenceless, the French returned, seized the cargo left behind by the Spanish ships, and set several buildings ablaze. French corsair raids continued the following year, targeting Santiago de Cuba and Havana. A Spanish caravel repelled the attack on Santiago de Cuba, while the unopposed raid on Havana yielded little, as the settlers had barely recovered from the previous assault.

==== Italian War of 1551–1559 ====
Hostilities between France and Spain resumed in 1552, with the Caribbean emerging as a major theatre for the European conflict as squadrons of the French Royal Navy advanced into the Spanish Caribbean. Although French naval efforts initially targeted Spanish treasure fleets in the Atlantic, their lack of success led them to turn westward in search of plunder in the Caribbean.

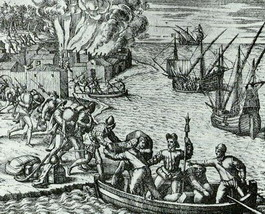
The sacking of Havana in 1555 by French corsair Jacques de Sores

Many of the towns raided by French corsairs in Cuba had fewer than 500 permanent residents. Notable corsair raids on Cuba during the conflict includes the destruction of Santiago de Cuba by François Le Clerc in 1554 and Jacques de Sores's attack on Havana in 1555. Sores seized a poorly defended Havana, landing with approximately 200 armed men. After a dispute with the local government, Sores killed several captives and enslaved Africans before setting the town ablaze and departing with a small amount of treasure extorted from Havana's settlers.

=== Anglo-Spanish War (1585–1604) ===
The Anglo-Spanish War (1585–1604) was an intermittent undeclared war between England and Spain, marked by naval engagements and military campaigns in Europe and the Americas, including the blockade of Western Cuba by English privateers in 1591. In March 1596, a naval engagement occurred in Cuban waters between Spanish and English forces, where a squadron of 13 Spanish galleons intercepted an English squadron of 14 ships resupplying at Isla de la Juventud in Cuba. As a result of that battle, the Spanish squadron captured an English vessel with 300 sailors, and its captives were forced to work on Havana's defensive structures.

In August 1603, a pair of English ships raided Santiago de Cuba, and captured two Spanish prizes in the Old Bahama Channel north of Cuba.

=== Eighty Years' War ===
The Eighty Years' War was an intermittent conflict between the rebels in the Spanish Netherlands (later the Dutch Republic), and the Spanish Empire. In 1628, the Dutch West India Company sent a fleet of 30 ships, commanded by Piet Pieterszoon Hein, to capture the Spanish treasure fleets. Having been made aware of the Dutch fleet, the treasure fleet initially remained in port at Cartagena and Veracruz. However, the treasure fleet later set sail, after Spanish authorities mistook the movement of a few Dutch ships back to Europe for the entirety of Hein's fleet. Hein's fleet waited nearby Havana for the treasure fleet to arrive, as the ships from South America and Mexico typically rendezvous at that city before crossing the Atlantic Ocean.

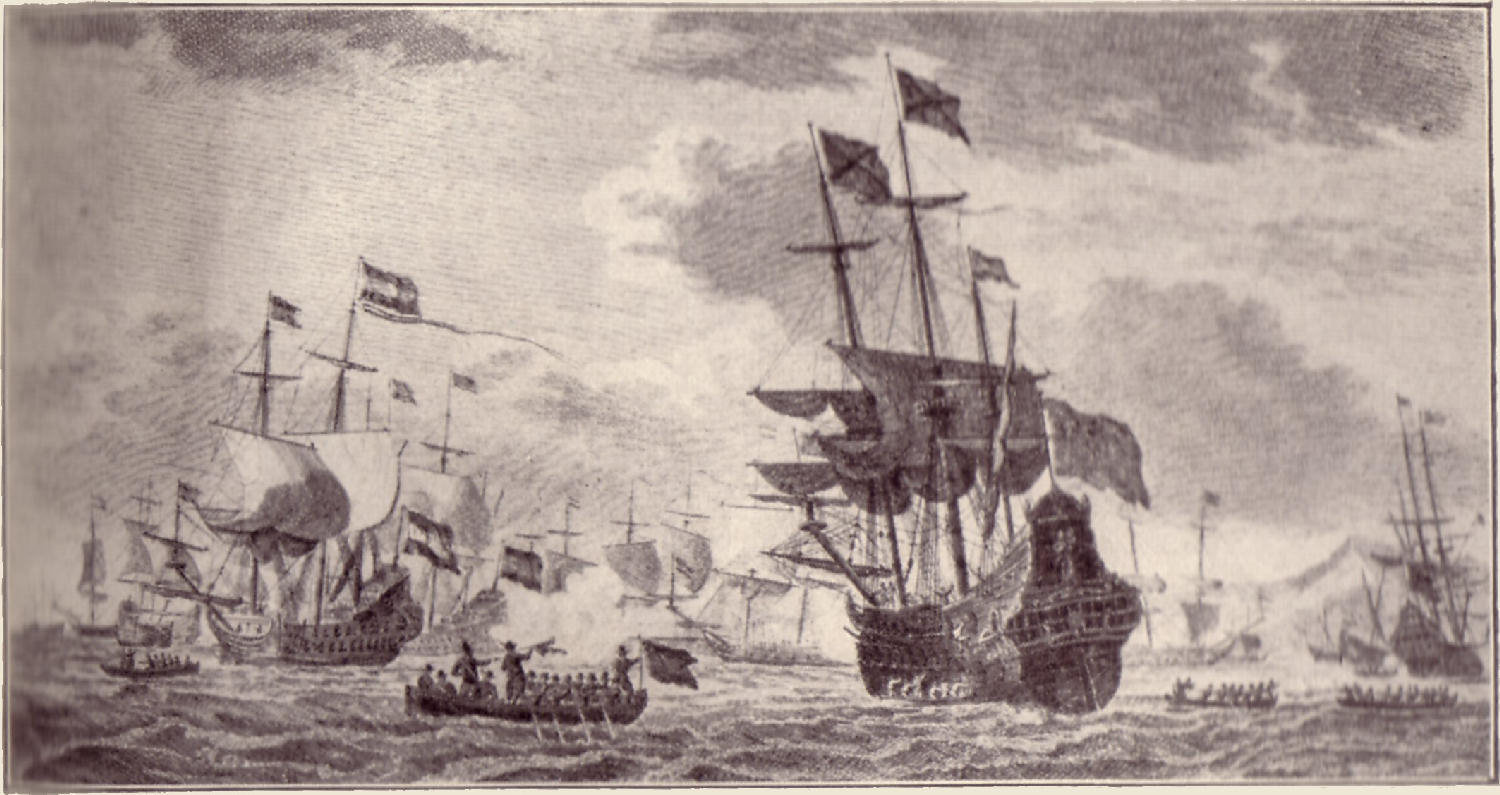
Depiction of the Dutch capture of the Spanish treasure fleet during the Battle in the Bay of Matanzas

The treasure fleet was intercepted on 8 September at the Battle in the Bay of Matanzas. The Spanish galleons escorting the fleet abandoned the merchantmen capture, instead seeking refuge at bay of Matanzas. However, all four galleons ran aground as they were too laden with cargo and passengers, and were forced to surrender. The Dutch seized over 90 tonnes of gold and silver, valued at 11.5 million guilders. The incident remained the only time an entire treasure fleet's cargo was taken.

Another attempt to capture the Spanish treasure fleet was made off the coast of Cabañas in 1638, but it ended in failure.

=== Portuguese Restoration War ===
Cuba became vulnerable to English attack after the English conquest of the colony of Santiago in 1655, during the Anglo-Spanish War of 1654–1660. In 1662, amid the Portuguese Restoration War, an English fleet under Christopher Myngs was dispatched to disrupt Spanish possessions in the Caribbean. The fleet of twelve ships and approximately 2,000 men, captured Santiago de Cuba with little resistance. The town's defences were deemed inadequate, leading the governor to withdraw his forces to Bayamo, while many inhabitants fled to the nearby indigenous settlement of El Caney. Santiago de Cuba was subsequently sacked, and the Castillo de San Pedro de la Roca was destroyed. However, the English had no long-term aims of establishing a Cuban foothold, they withdrew a few days later.

=== Privateer raids in the late 17th century ===
The threat of English privateers against Cuban settlements diminished after the signing of the 1670 Treaty of Madrid, in which Spain formally recognized England's Caribbean possessions. Spain later signed a similar agreement with France under the Peace of Ryswick in 1697, through which the French agreed to end their buccaneer attacks.

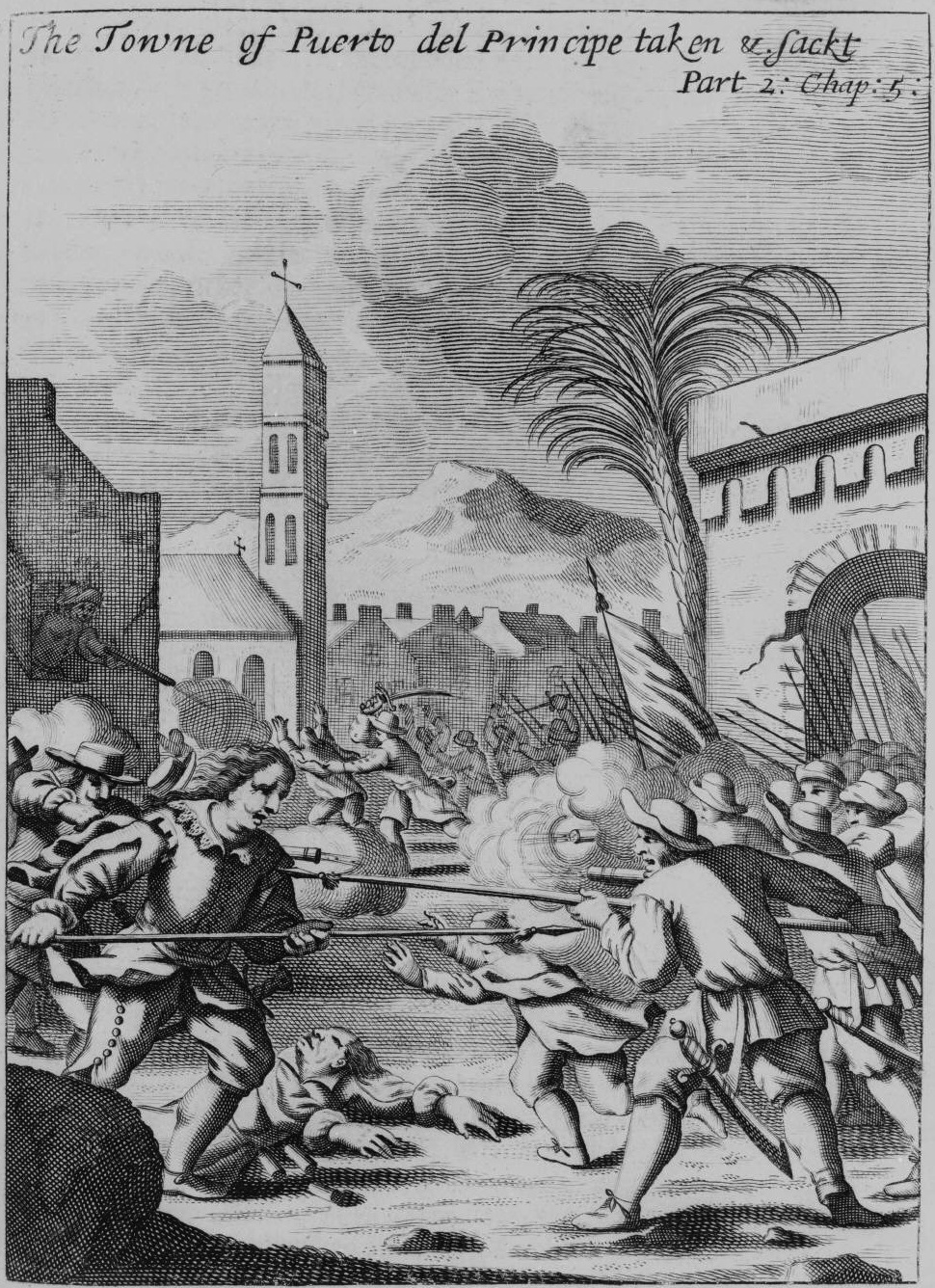
Privateers under Henry Morgan raid Puerto del Príncipe in 1688

However, pirate attacks on Cuban settlements continued as late as 1688, with the Welsh privateer Henry Morgan being dispatched by the governor of Jamaica to investigate reports of a possible Spanish attack. After landing on Cuba's southern coast, Morgan's force advanced inland to Puerto del Príncipe and raided it.

== 18th century ==
Cuba's militia system was expanded during the 18th century, growing from one company in 1600 to three full battalions and 16 separate companies by 1770. Several Cuban militia units partook in military campaigns beyond the confines of Cuba during the 18th century.

Auxiliary labour battalions manned by Black slaves were also formed to augment Cuban forces. Slaves were initially pressed into service only for construction work, although by 1765, select slaves were also pressed into service with the artillery corps.

=== War of Jenkin's Ear ===
The War of Jenkins' Ear was a conflict between Britain and Spain and was the first major European war fought expressly for Caribbean aims, as both colonial powers sought to secure their trade routes in the region. Early in the conflict, British forces in Jamaica concentrated their attacks on the Spanish Main instead of Cuba, as Havana lay too far windward from Jamaica to attack quickly and return in the shortest time possible. Although the Spanish Havana squadron was reinforced at the onset of the conflict, the size of the British force in the Caribbean compelled Spain to adopt a largely defensive posture in the region.

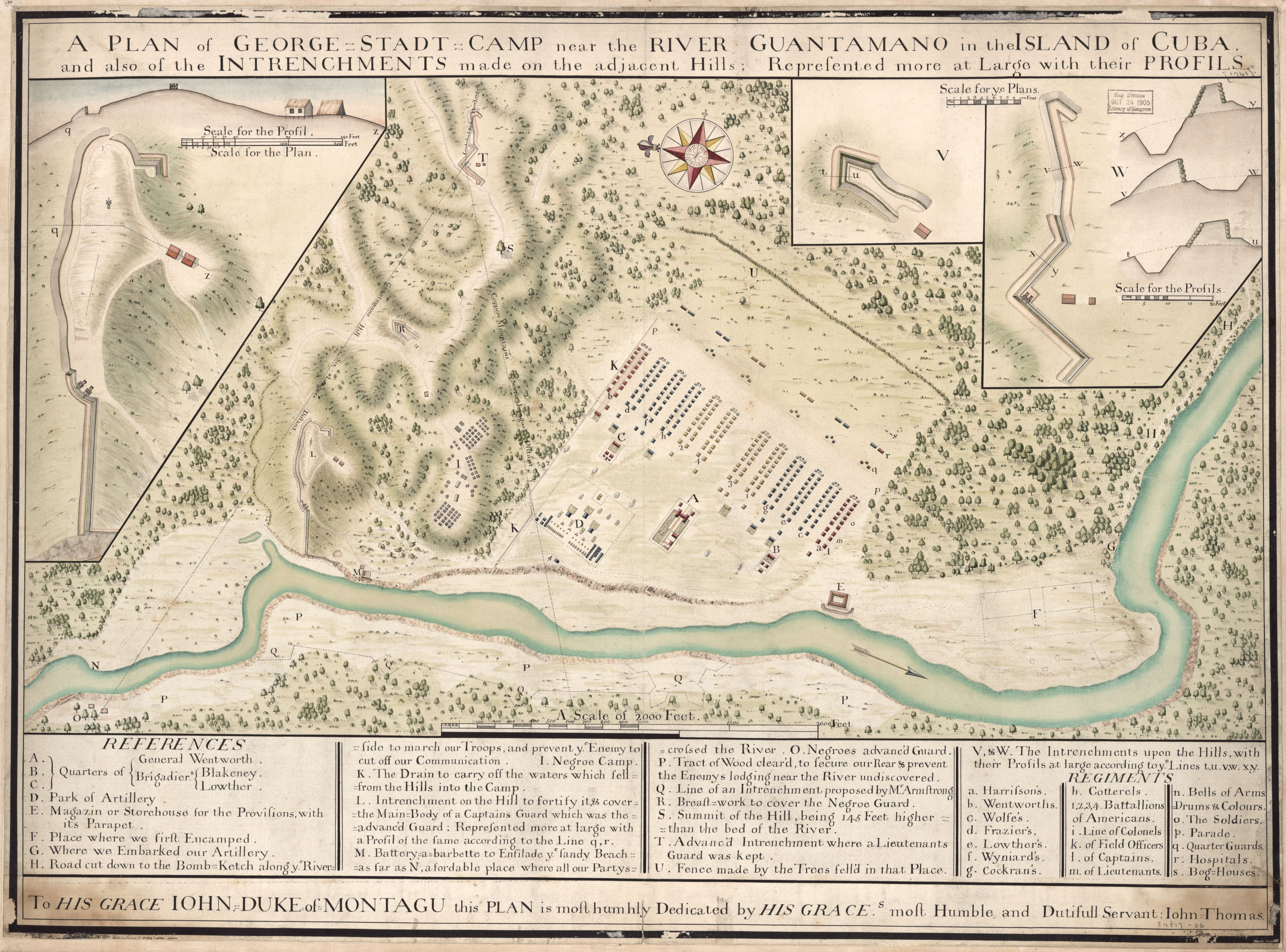
Map of a British encampment at Guantánamo Bay, shortly after British forces seized the area in 1741

In July 1741, British forces seized Guantánamo Bay largely unopposed, in preparation for their attack on Santiago de Cuba. British attempts to invade Cuba from the bay failed, and its forces were withdrawn from Guantánamo by December.

Spain's military position in the Caribbean improved after failed British attacks on Guantánamo and Panama weakened British forces in the region, and the subsumption of the conflict into the wider War of the Austrian Succession shifted British attention to Europe. From 1741 to 1748, the Havana squadron's primary responsibility was the protection of the Spanish treasure fleet that sailed from Havana, with the defence of the Cuban coast and harassment of British privateers and illicit traders being a secondary concern. Although the Havana squadron rarely left its port after 1741, it effectively became a fleet in being, threatening British convoys in the Straits of Florida and preventing any potential offensive operations against the French colony of Saint-Domingue.

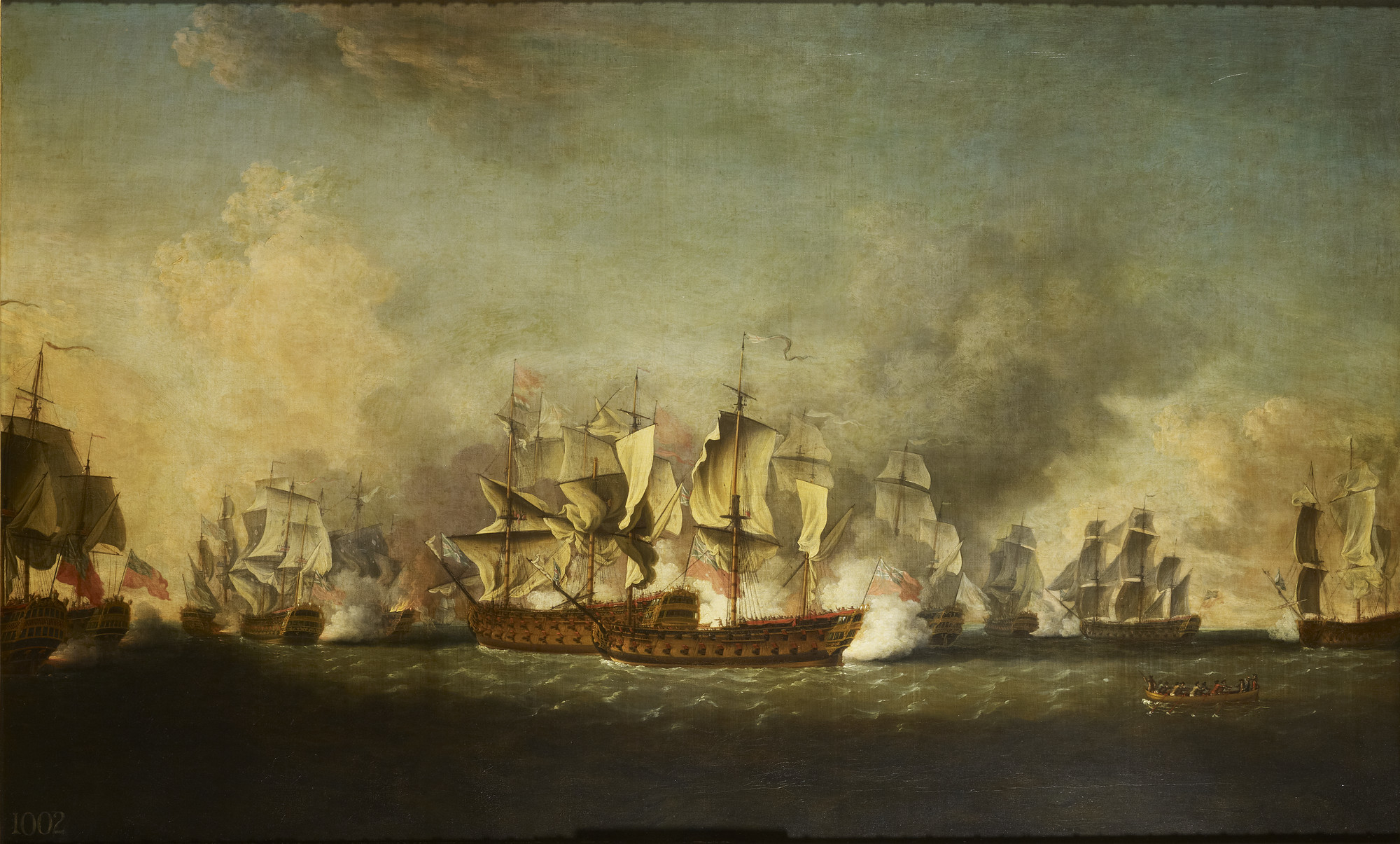
The Spanish and British Caribbean squadrons engage one another during the battle of Havana in 1748

The British squadron in Jamaica resumed its offensive operations shortly after the arrival of Sir Charles Knowles in January 1748. His squadron attacked Santiago de Cuba in April 1748, although withdrew after experiencing some resistance. Anticipating the departure of Spanish treasure ships from Veracruz to Havana, Knowles mobilized all available forces in Jamaica to capture these ships. The commander of the Havana squadron, Andrés Reggio, initially sailed to intercept them but later ordered a return to port due to the enemy's superior numbers. On their return, the Havana squadron encountered a British convoy and gave chase, although one British escort broke off from the convoy to alert Knowles of their location. On 12 October, near Havana, the Spanish and British squadrons clashed until the Spanish were compelled to withdraw. British forces pursued the Havana squadron's flagship until 15 October, when the British anchored just outside Havana Harbour. The following day, Spanish officials notified Knowles of a preliminary peace agreement between Britain and Spain, and that all hostilities were to cease immediately.

=== Seven Years' War ===
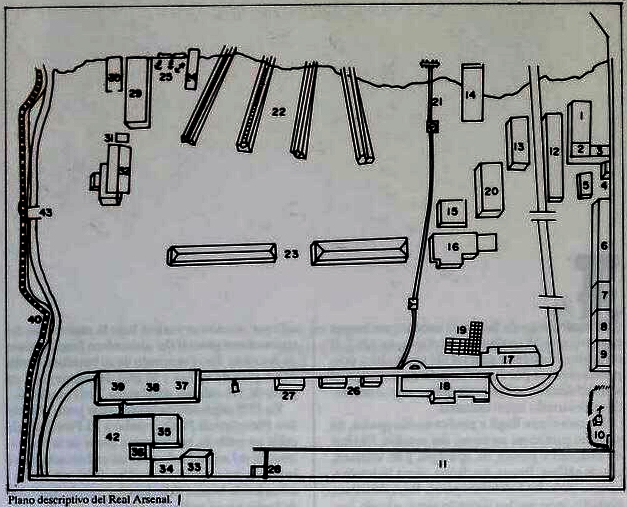
Diagram of the Royal Shipyard of Havana, c. 1760s. The shipyard and other vital military infrastructure in Cuba made it a target for attack during the Anglo-Spanish War of 1762–1763.

In August 1761, Spain and France entered into the Third Bourbon Family Compact, where the former agreed to enter the Seven Years' War on the side of the latter by May 1762. War between the British and Spanish ensued in January 1762 when Spain disregarded a British ultimatum to abandon its commitment to the Bourbon Compact. Facing financial strain from its ongoing war with France and support for Prussia, the British, recognized the impracticality of prolonged conflict with the Spanish Empire and instead opted to capture Havana in Cuba and Manila in the Philippines to deliver a "decisive blow" against Spain's trading economy and force them to negotiate for peace.

Havana was chosen as the target for the attack due to its significance as a rendezvous point for the Spanish treasure fleet and because of its military infrastructure, including the Royal Shipyard of Havana—one of three pivotal naval shipbuilding and repair yards Spain possesses in the region. The British set sail for Havana on 26 May 1762, with the invasion fleet capturing four Spanish naval vessels at the Old Bahama Channel on 2 June.

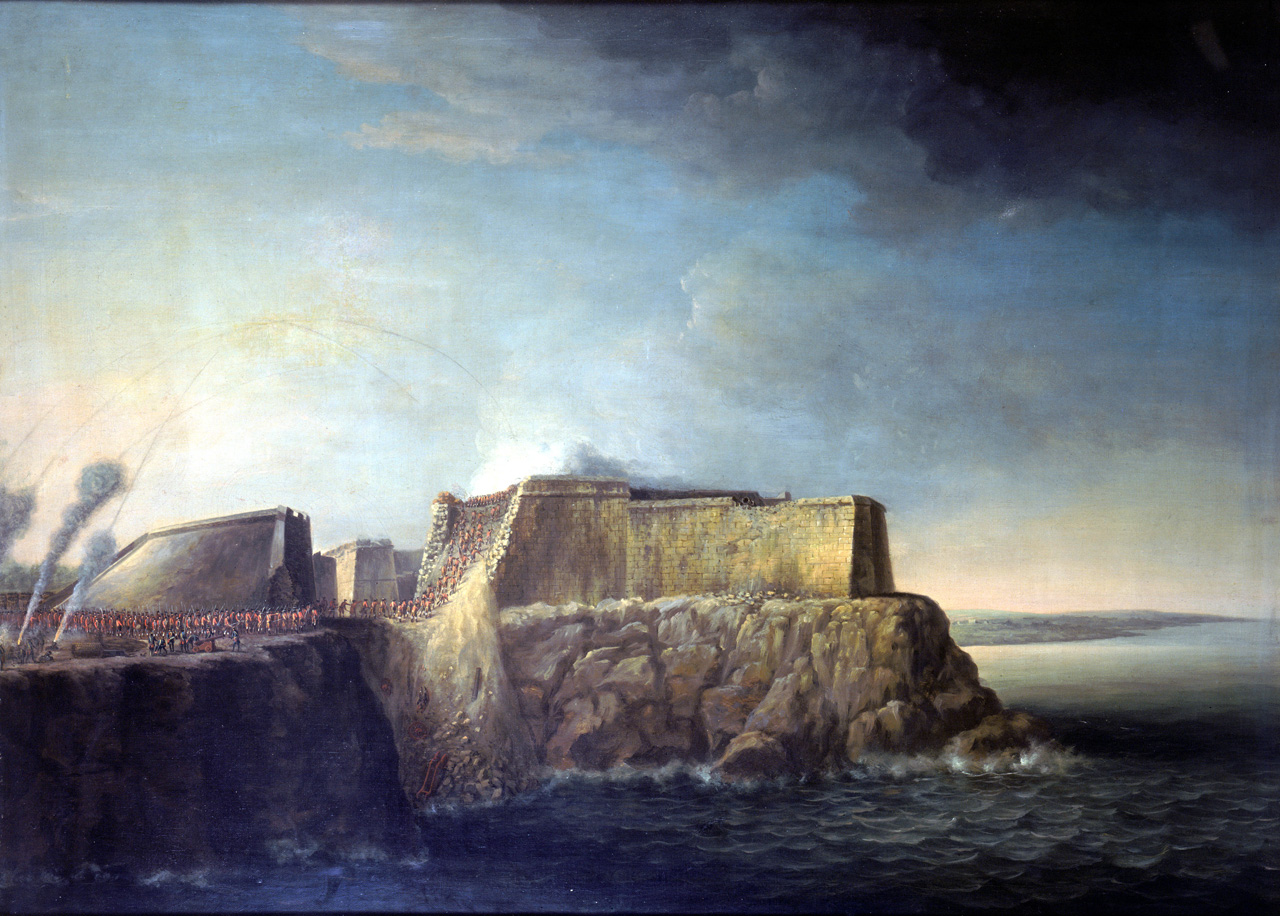
The storming of Morro Castle by British forces during the siege of Havana in July 1762.

The siege of Havana began on 6 June, with the city being defended by a 4.8-kilometre-long (3 mi) circuit wall and forts spread throughout it and manned by Spanish regulars and Cuban militiamen, while the harbour itself was protected by Spanish ships anchored within. Throughout the siege, British forces were reinforced by garrisoned soldiers from North America. By August, Havana's defenders faced a shortage of manpower and ammunition needed to prolong the siege. Don Juan de Prado, the captain-general of Cuba, surrendered Havana to the British on 13 August, beginning an 11-month occupation. Havana, along with Manila, was returned at the end of the war in 1763, with the signing of the Treaty of Paris.

As a result of the peace, Spain was forced to cede Spanish Florida to the British, although received the Louisiana territory of New France as compensation. In the years after the war, several Native American delegations from Florida sought assistance from Spanish officials in Cuba to support their war effort against British colonists. However, Spanish officials in Cuba refused these requests, as they lacked the authority to grant them and could not provide support against the British due to the terms of the recent peace treaty.

=== Louisiana Rebellion ===
Tensions between dissenting French Creoles in Louisiana against the newly appointed Spanish governor, Antonio de Ulloa, took place in the years after the territory was handed over to the French, and a petition for Ulloa's expulsion was made after he introduced restrictive trade regulations. Nicolas Chauvin de La Frénière, the territory's attorney general, played a crucial role in rallying French Creole merchants against Spain's trade restrictions.

The Spanish government, with consent from the French royal court, sent General Alejandro O'Reilly to suppress the rebellion. O'Reilly arrived in 1769 with a force of nearly 2,000 men, including 240 Cuban militiamen. O'Reilly's force took control of New Orleans without bloodshed and executed Lafrénière and his coconspirators. O'Reilly then proceeded to institute several changes, including new trade restrictions that made Havana the chief entrepôt for Spanish and French traders in New Orleans and effectively made the governor of Louisiana dependent on Cuba.

=== American Revolutionary War ===
During the first few years of the American Revolutionary War, the Spanish Empire used Havana as a port to support American revolutionaries, with Spanish authorities granting merchants and vessels associated with the revolution access to Havana's trade and treating them as a "most favoured nation". As Cuba had a substantial supply of Mexican silver on hand, typically used to subsidize the island's administrative and military expenses, the Spanish government authorized the transfer of this silver from Havana to the revolutionaries to help finance their war.

Spain formally entered the conflict against the British in 1779, after the enactment of the Treaty of Aranjuez. Cuban soldiers fought alongside Mexicans, Spaniards, Puerto Ricans, and Dominicans under General Bernardo de Gálvez' command as far north as present-day Michigan. Cuban militias later took part in the capture of the Bahamas during the twilight of the conflict in 1783, with the Spanish attacking the Bahamas in a bid to gain some territorial concessions from the British during peace negotiations.

The resulting conflict led to the growth of Cuban-US trade relations, although trade between the emerging American republic and Cuba ceased for a brief period after the war between 1783 and 1789, owing to Spanish officials' apprehension towards the growth in Cuban-US trading relations during the war and the perceived threat of the United States against Spain's territorial holdings in North America.

== 19th century ==
During the Spanish American wars of independence, a significant number of Spanish soldiers were based in Cuba, with the colony being transformed into a hub for Spanish counterrevolutionary operations. A large Spanish garrison of 15,000 to 20,000 soldiers was maintained in Cuba following the end of the Spanish American wars for independence.

As a result of the wars of independence throughout Spanish America, Cuba's organized militia companies experienced a decline throughout the 19th century. By 1830, soldiers from Spain made up the majority of Cuba's armed battalions. The establishment of a paid insular police force in 1851, akin to the Spanish Civil Guard, further reduced the importance of the militia. Although Cuban-based units were less prominent in the 19th century, several Cuban military units still saw overseas service, with Cuban regiments sent to the Dominican Republic to support the Spanish occupation of that country in 1861. However, by the onset of the Ten Years' War, the militia no longer played a significant role in the armies of the Cuban royal government, with many of these militiamen forming the bulk of revolutionary armies.

The latter-19th century would see several Cuban revolts that would culminate in US intervention and the end of Spanish colonial rule in the Americas.

=== López expeditions ===
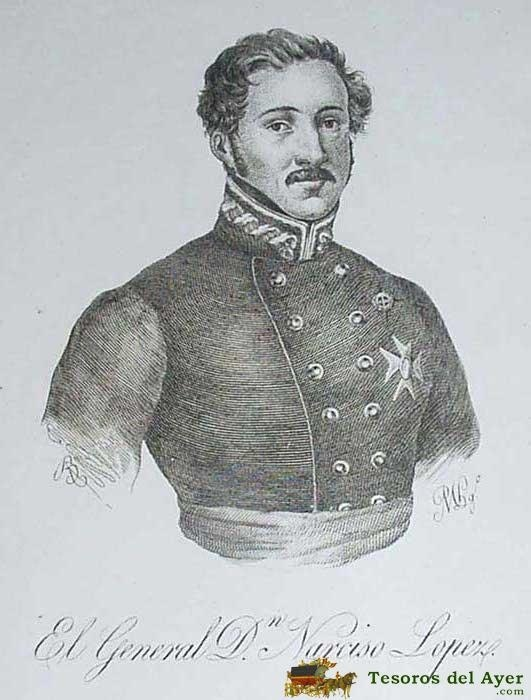
Narciso López, a former Spanish general turned filibuster, led two expeditions against Spanish Cuba from the United States.

In the 1840s, a group of Cuban plantation and business owners conspired to overthrow Spanish rule in Cuba and pursue annexation by the United States. The plot was discovered by colonial authorities, prompting their military leader, Narciso López, to flee to New Orleans. From the US, López drew support for a filibustering expedition to Cuba from Cuban exiles, American businessmen and sugar traders, proponents of American expansionism, and later from Southern plantation owners who had an interest in Cuba becoming a US slave state.

López raised $50,000 through the sale of bonds and recruited 500 soldiers, who embarked for Cuba in May 1850. The force captured the coastal city of Cárdenas, Cuba, and hoisted the expeditionary banner symbolizing American statehood in Cuba, whose design would later form the modern flag of Cuba. The Spanish Army eventually repelled López's force at Cárdenas, forcing their retreat back to the US. Upon his return, López was arrested for violating the US Neutrality Act of 1794, although prosecutors later abandoned the charge.

López launched another expedition of 400 soldiers in August 1851, but it was swiftly crushed by Spanish forces, as the local Cuban support he had expected failed to materialize. López was captured and later executed in Havana.

=== Ten Years' War ===
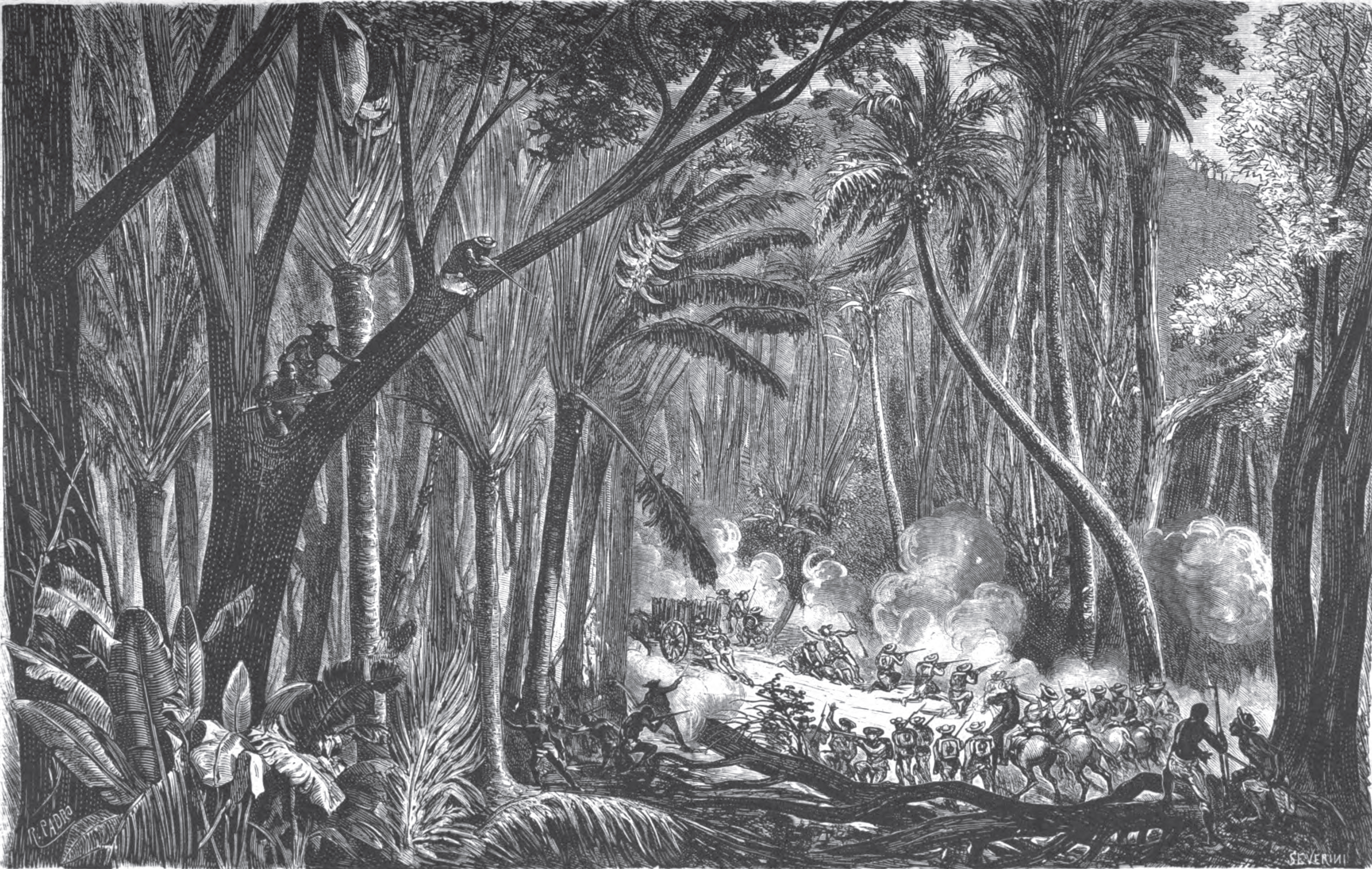
Depiction of an engagement between Cuban rebels and Spanish Royalists in 1872

The Ten Years' War (1868–78) was the first of three wars that Cuba fought against Spain for its independence. The Ten Years' War began when Carlos Manuel de Céspedes and his followers of patriots from his sugar mill La Demajagua began an uprising. Dominican exiles, including Máximo Gómez, Luis Marcano and Modesto Díaz, joined the new Revolutionary Army and provided its initial training and leadership. With reinforcements and guidance from the Dominicans, the Cuban rebels defeated Spanish detachments, cut railway lines, and gained dominance over vast sections of the eastern portion of the island.

On 19 February 1874, Gómez and 700 other rebels marched westward from their eastern base and defeated 2,000 Spanish troops at El Naranjo. The Spaniards lost 100 killed and 200 wounded and the rebels a total of 150 killed and wounded. The most significant rebel victory came at the Battle of Las Guasimas, which took place from 16 to 20 March 1874. During the battle, 2,050 rebels, led by Antonio Maceo and Gómez, defeated 5,000 Spanish troops with six cannons. The five-day battle cost the Spanish 1,037 casualties and the rebels 174 casualties.

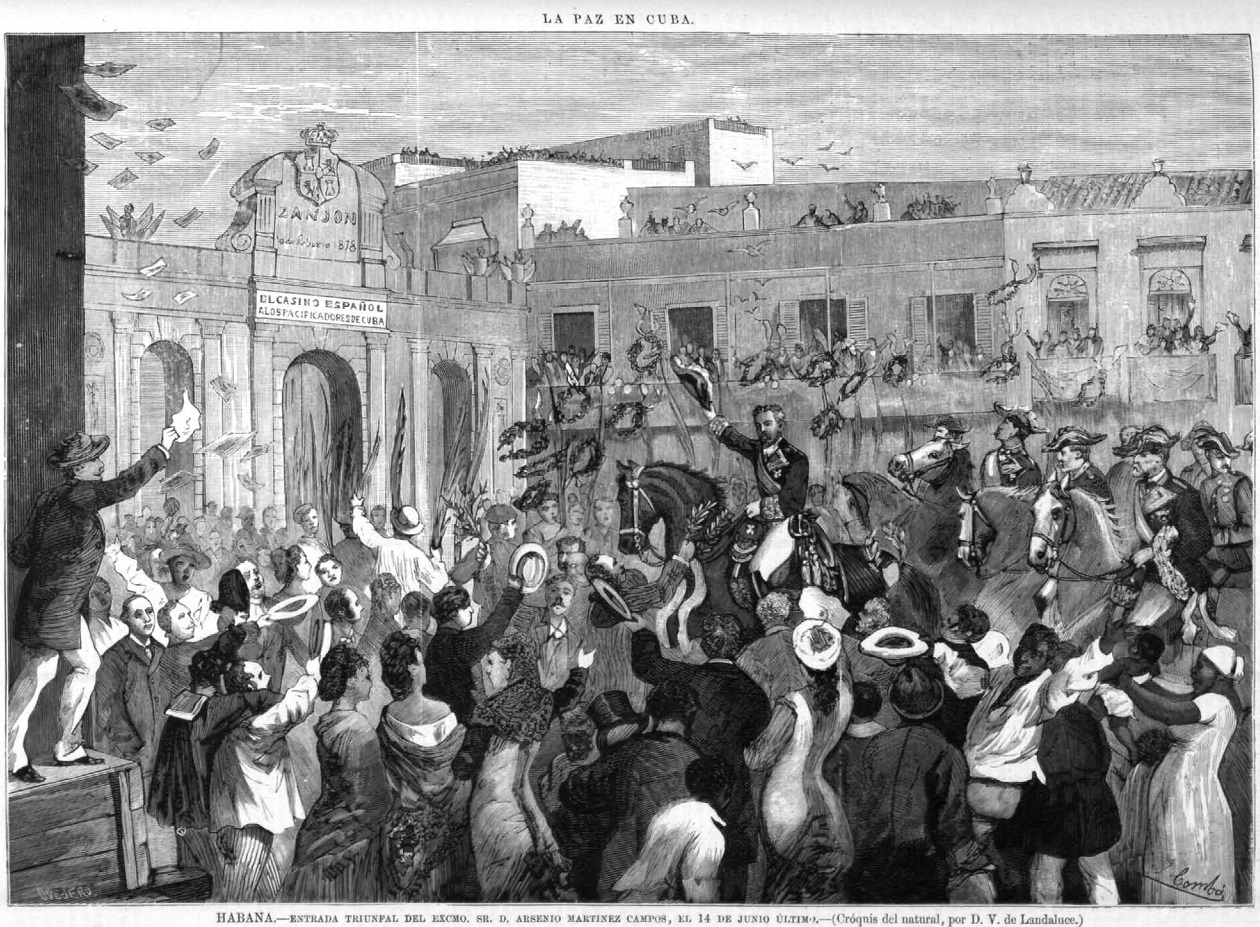
Arrival of Spanish General Arsenio Martínez Campos after the conflict and the signing of the Pact of Zanjón, 1878

The Spanish built a fortified line (La Trocha) to prevent Gómez to move westward from Oriente province; it consisted of numerous small forts, wire fences and a parallel railroad line. It was the largest Spanish fortification in the New World. Gómez began an invasion of Western Cuba in 1875; he burned 83 plantations around Sancti Spíritus within a six-week period and freed their slaves. However, the vast majority of slaves and wealthy sugar producers in the region did not join the revolt. After his most trusted general, the American Henry Reeve, was killed in 1876, the invasion was over. The war ended with the signing of the Pact of Zanjón. The Spanish lost 27,000 troops in battle and another 54,000 dead from disease. The rebels sustained 40,000 dead and the island sustained over $300 million in property damage.

=== Little War ===
The Little War (1879–1880) was a rebellion engineered by Calixto García. Occurring from August 1879 to late 1880, it involved insurgents who rejected the Pact of Zanjón, and was eventually quelled by Spanish forces. Following the conflict, Spain provided Cuba representation in the Cortes Generales and abolished slavery in 1886, although its other promised reforms were never materialized.

=== Cuban War of Independence ===
Death of José Martí at the Battle of Dos Ríos, 1895

The Cuban War of Independence began in February 1895, fuelled by economic hardship and growing unrest after Spain imposed new taxes and trade restrictions, after they cancelled a trade agreement between Cuba and the US. José Martí, founder of the Cuban Revolutionary Party, emerged as an early leader of the war. Together with Máximo Gómez, he issued the Manifesto of Montecristi, which outlined the independence movement’s aims and affirmed its commitment to establishing an independent Cuban republic. However, Martí's death at the Battle of Dos Ríos in May left other commanders like Antonio Maceo to lead the guerilla campaign, using mobile operations and knowledge of local terrain to counter Spain's numerical superiority.

Action at Ojo de Agua, during the Invasion from East to West in Cuba, 1895

In September 1895, the Republic of Cuba in Arms was established, and the movement expanded its operations from eastern Cuba to the central and western provinces. Sugar plantations and other economic resources were also targetted by insurgents to undermine the colonial administration's revenue stream and supply networks.

Spain responded by sending 100,000 soldiers to Cuba in 1895 and appointing General Valeriano Weyler as governor-general and commander of Spanish forces in Cuba in 1896, tasking him with suppressing the rebellion. To deprive the insurgents of civilian support and supplies, Weyler introduced a policy of reconcentration that forced rural inhabitants into towns and fortified settlements under Spanish control. However, the policy failed to quell the insurgency and intensified American sympathy for the Cuban cause amid widespread disease, poor sanitation, and food shortages as a result of the policy.

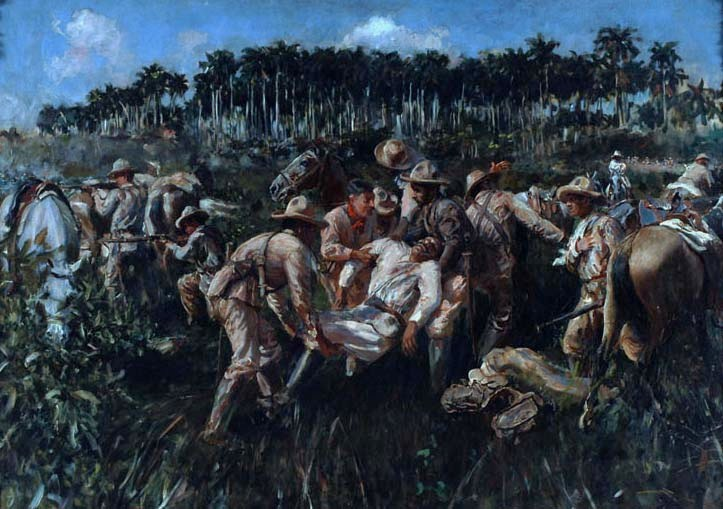
Death of Cuban General Antonio Maceo at the Battle of San Pedro, 1896

In December 1896, Maceo was killed in combat at the Battle of San Pedro, depriving the movement of another one of its military commanders. Cuban forces continued their resistance under Gómez and other insurgent leaders, as Spain struggled to achieve a decisive victory against the insurgency. With the rebellions in Cuba and the Philippines straining Spanish military resources, and following the assassination of Antonio Cánovas del Castillo in August 1897, Spain sought to end the Cuban rebellion through diplomatic concessions. It replaced Weyler with General Ramón Blanco, 1st Marquess of Peña Plata and introduced a scheme of autonomy for Cuba, but the independence leadership rejected the arrangement.

==== American entry and the Spanish–American War ====
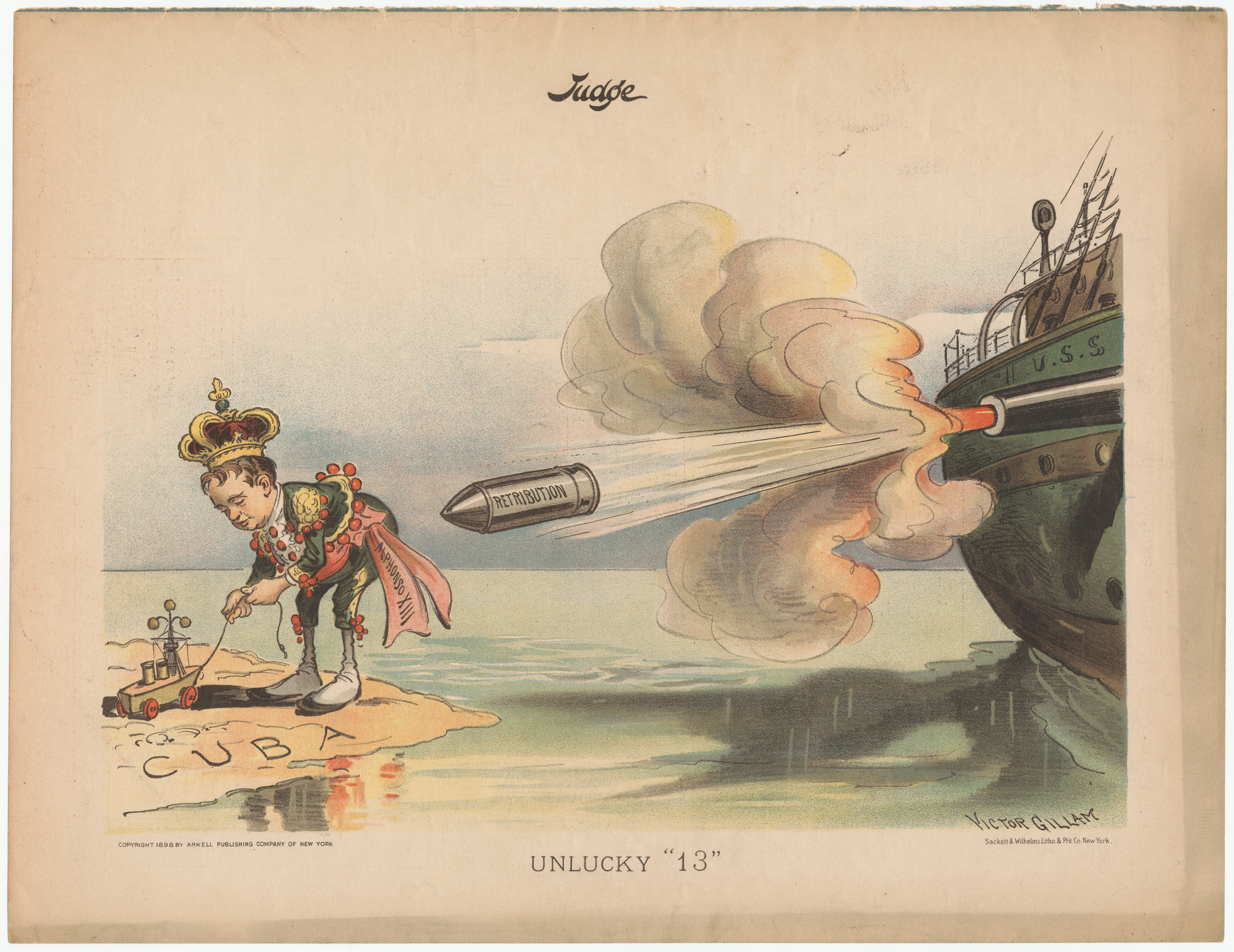
A political cartoon where a US Navy warship fires a shell labeled "Retribution" at King Alfonso XIII, who is shown playing with a toy boat in Cuba. The cartoon was published shortly after the sinking of the USS Maine in Havana Harbor, 1898.

Tensions between Spain and the US escalated in 1897 and 1898 as American public opinion reacted negatively to Weyler's reconcentration policy, the publication of the De Lôme Letter in February 1898, and the sinking of the USS Maine in Havana Harbor later that month. Spain made further concessions, including measures to end reconcentration, but these failed to resolve the conflict or satisfy US demands. The US Congress declared war on Spain in April, with the Teller Amendment disclaiming any intention to annex Cuba.

The United States Navy imposed a naval blockade on Cuba in April 1898. A Spanish naval squadron commanded by Admiral Pascual Cervera y Topete entered Santiago de Cuba, though was subsequently blockaded by the US Navy. In June, US marines land at Guantánamo Bay with assistance from Cuban forces, establishing an American foothold on the island. In the same month, Cuban Lieutenant General Calixto García met with American commanders, Major General William R. Shafter and Rear Admiral William T. Sampson to coordinate the campaign around Santiago de Cuba. García facilitated contact with Cuban leaders and US forces throughout the conflict, with Gomez also providing troops, intelligence, and local knowledge for US forces.

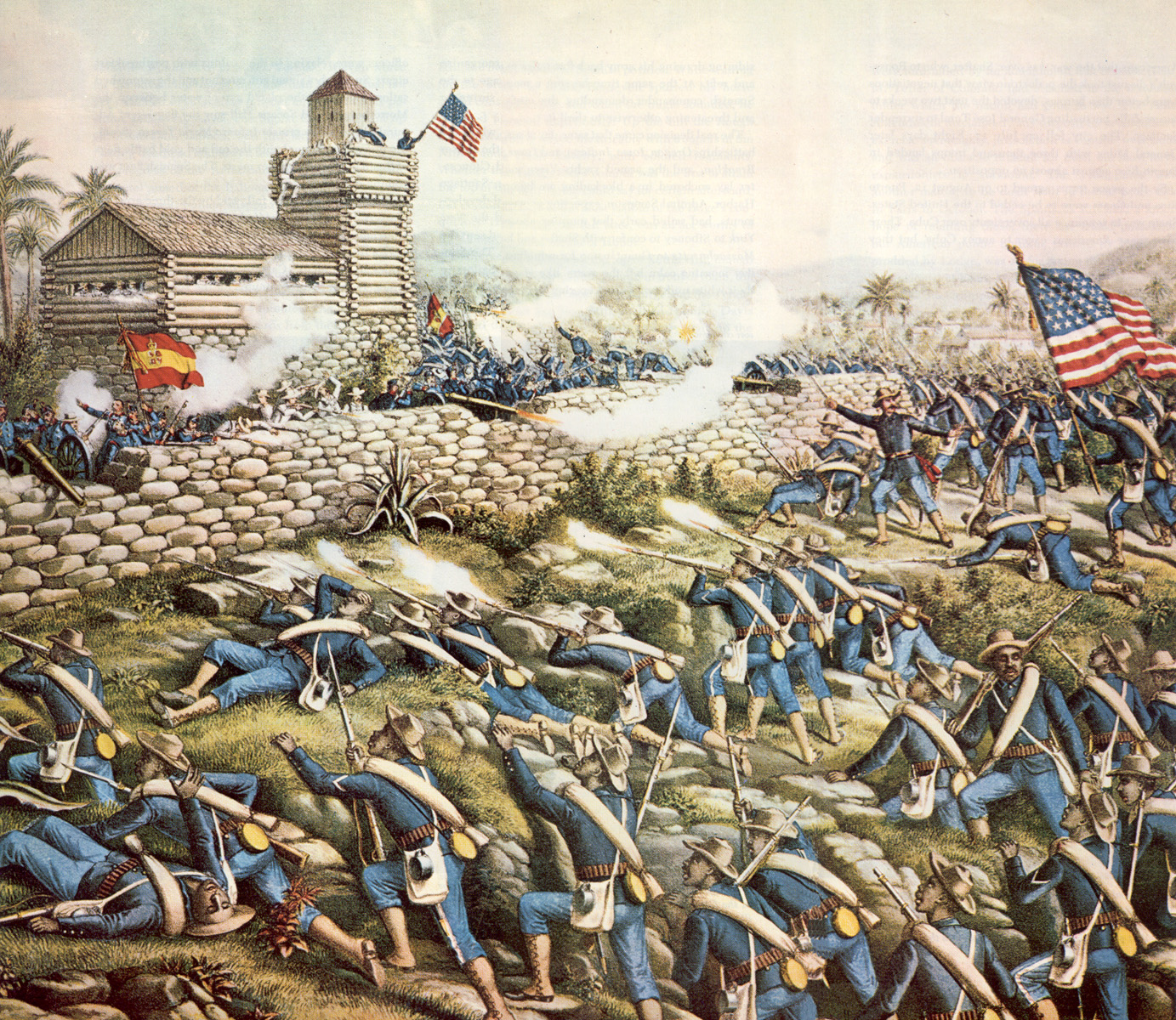
Charge of the 24th and 25th Colored Infantry during the Battle of San Juan Hill, 1898

American forces advanced on Santiago de Cuba in June 1898, first clashing with Spanish troops at the Battle of Las Guásimas. US forces, supported by Cuban insurgents, cleared the approach to Santiago de Cuba by capturing key positions at the battles of El Caney and San Juan Heights. On 3 July, the Spanish squadron attempted to escape Santiago Harbor but was destroyed by the US Navy at the Battle of Santiago de Cuba, eliminating Spain's principal naval force in the region and isolating its garrison on the island.

On 17 July 1898, Spanish forces surrendered Santiago de Cuba to the US. Cuban independence forces were excluded from the formal surrender, prompting García to protest their treatment by the American command. Having been defeated in the Pacific and the Caribbean, Spain signed a peace protocol with the US ending hostilities. Cuba was administered by the US until May 1902, when the Republic of Cuba was inaugurated. As a condition for ending the US occupation, Cuba reluctantly accepted the Platt Amendment, which authorized the establishment of US naval bases on the island and permitted US intervention in Cuban affairs to preserve its republican government and prevent European interference.

== 20th century ==
Following Cuba's independence in May 1902, no standing army was established. Instead, the Cuban Rural Guard was formed by the US as a national constabulary to maintain internal order on the island.

=== Second US occupation of Cuba ===
Cuba descended into political crisis following the 1905 Cuban general election, as President Tomás Estrada Palma's administration faced allegations of corruption and disputes over veterans' pensions. Alleging electoral fraud, supporters of the Liberal Party of Cuba, led by José Miguel Gómez, revolted against Palma's government and launched a minor guerilla war. Palma invoked the Platt Amendment, declaring that he could no longer maintain order and requesting US intervention. Reluctant to intervene directly, the US initially dispatched mediators to negotiate a compromise. However, after negotiations collapsed, Palma and his cabinet resigned, leaving the island without an effective government.

In September 1906, the United States established a provisional government to restore order, and dispatched 5,000 United States Army soldiers and 1,000 US marines to Cuba. US troops primarily guarded key economic assets and sought to prevent insurgents from using acts of destruction to provoke a wider conflict. They were withdrawn in January 1909, following the holding of new elections.

=== War of 1912 ===
The War of 1912 was an armed uprising associated with the Partido Independiente de Color (PIC), which began on 20 May 1912. Founded in 1908 by Afro-Cubans, many of whom were veterans of the Cuban War of Independence, the PIC sought to challenge the racial discrimination and political inequalities that persisted under the Cuban republic. The PIC's success threatened the established political order, garnering political support from Afro-Cubans across the island. This resulted in the passage of the Morúa Amendment of 1910, which prohibited political parties organized exclusively along racial lines and effectively outlawed the PIC. In protest, PIC leaders led a nonviolent, but armed, protest in May 1912.

The Cuban government of President José Miguel Gómez responded by deploying a modernized army equipped with naval weapons and cruisers, alongside militiamen and armed civilians serving as government-supported guerrillas. The military campaign was concentrated in eastern Cuba, where government forces sought to suppress the rebellion, justifying the campaign as a defense of national order and "civilization," conflating the PIC as an attempted black political takeover. The US also deployed four companies of marines and four warships to Cuba to protect American nationals and property.

The scale of the Cuban military's response was disproportionate to the insurgents' offensive capacity, according to historians like Alejandro de la Fuente's. An estimated 3,000 to 6,000 Afro-Cubans were killed during the conflict, with the military suppression consequently becoming intertwined with a broader campaign of repression against Afro-Cubans, and the state's pursuit of blanqueamiento or "whitening".

=== Chambelona War and World War I ===
The Chambelona War began in February 1917 following the 1916 Cuban general election. President Mario García Menocal candidacy faced opposition from the Liberal Party, which nominated Alfredo Zayas y Alfonso. The election was marked by violence and allegations of electoral fraud by both parties, with the Cuban Supreme Court eventually ruling in favour of the Liberals in several disputed electoral districts, with partial elections scheduled for February 1917.

However, armed disturbances in Havana and Santa Clara provinces broke out on 11 February, with organized rebellion seeking to overthrow Menocal breaking out in Camagüey, Santa Clara and Oriente the following day, with numerous rural guards participating. The government received support from the US, with government forces gradually regaining control of several areas, although insurgents captured Santiago de Cuba and other towns. On 8 March, government troops defeated the main rebel force at Placetas, capturing Liberal leader José Miguel Gómez and approximately 200 of his followers. Despite the defeat of the main insurgent army, smaller armed groups continued operating.

==== Entry into a wider conflict ====
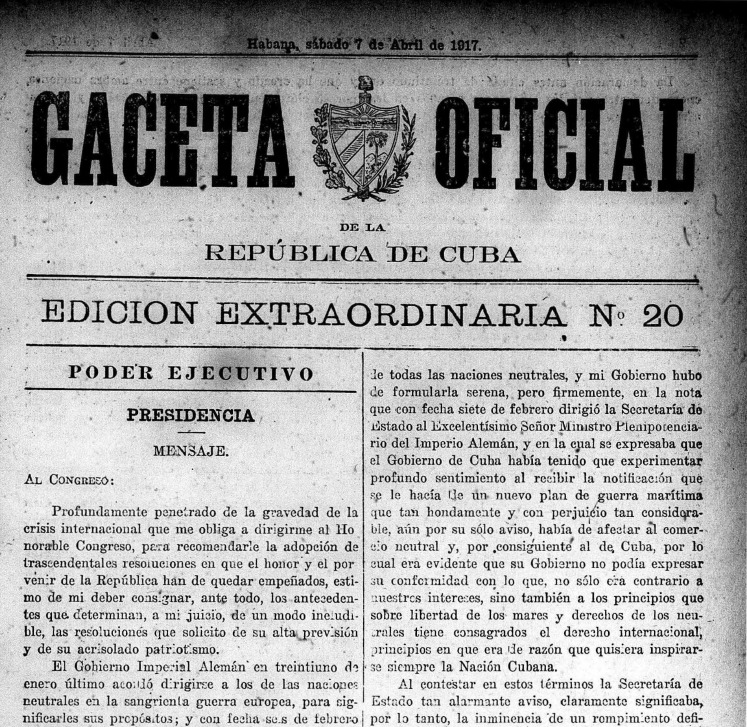
A newspaper from Cuba with the Cuban declaration of war on its front page

On 6 April, Menocal addressed the Cuban Congress and it follow the US declaration of war against Germany. Congress declared war on Germany the following day. The ongoing rebellion and potential disruptions to sugar production consequently became an additional concern for both governments. To support the Cuban government's efforts to suppress the insurgents and protect US economic interests, American naval forces and marines were deployed to the Cuba. By May 1917, organised resistance had largely collapsed, although sporadic insurgent activity continued, particularly in eastern Cuba.

Following the suppression of the revolt, Cuba concentrated on increasing agricultural production to supply the US and its allies during the war. Sugar became the island's principal contribution to the Allied war effort. Menocal also offered the US campsites in Cuba for possible winter military training. Cuba's military contribution to the war was minimal, with the most notable action being the seizure of German ships in Cuban ports. US forces deployed to Cuba were eventually withdrawn in 1922.

=== Cuban Revolution of 1933 ===
The Cuban Revolution of 1933 marked a significant turning point with the increasing political influence of the armed forces and their direct intervention in the transfer of national power. Under President Gerardo Machado, the Cuban military had assumed an increasing role in maintaining internal security and suppressing opposition. The suspension of constitutional guarantees and the extension of military jurisdiction over civilian matters further entrenched the armed forces within the country's political system. By July 1933, military expenditure accounted for nearly 20% of the national budget.

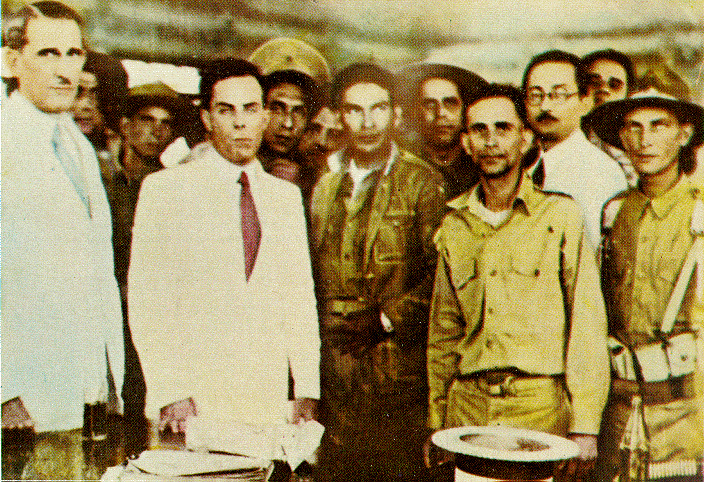
Anti-Machado opposition leaders with members of the Cuban military during the Cuban Revolution of 1933

The military's relationship with the Machado government deteriorated during the 1933 crisis and opposition movements advocated for Machado's removal as president. The growing likelihood of Machado's removal, combined with concerns over the possibility of American military intervention and the preservation of its institutional position, influenced the army to withdraw its support for Machado. On 12 August 1933, military installations in Havana, together with the Aviation Corps, informed Machado that they could no longer support his administration. The army's intervention facilitated Machado's departure and the subsequent transfer of authority to a provisional government headed initially by Alberto Herrera Franchi and subsequently by Carlos Manuel de Céspedes y Quesada.

Although the transfer of power was formally conducted through constitutional procedures, the military's intervention established a precedent in Cuban politics and demonstrated the armed forces' capacity to determine the outcome of national political crises independent of civilian institutions. Consequently, 1933 to 1940 marked a period of more direct military involvement in political affairs, with the army intervening on at least four occasions to displace civilian executives, contributing to the establishment of a praetorian political tradition in Cuba for subsequent decades.

=== World War II ===
Cuba entered World War II in December 1941. The Cuban Navy performed convoy escort duties and antisubmarine patrols during the Battle of the Caribbean; despite its small size, the Cuban Navy quickly developed a reputation for being extremely efficient. The most notable success of Cuban forces was the sinking of German submarine U-176 by a Cuban submarine chaser squadron. Six Cuban merchant vessels were sunk by German submarines in the conflict and 79 Cuban sailors were killed.

=== 1952 coup ===
Military strongman Fulgencio Batista staged a coup on 10 March 1952, removing Carlos Prío Socarrás from power. Cubans in general were stunned, but they were reluctant to fight. Batista created a consultative council from pliable political personalities of all parties who appointed him president months before elections were to be held in 1952. Batista's past democratic and pro-labor tendencies and the fear of another episode of bloody violence gained him tenuous support from the bankers, and the leader of the major labor confederation.

=== The Cuban Revolution ===
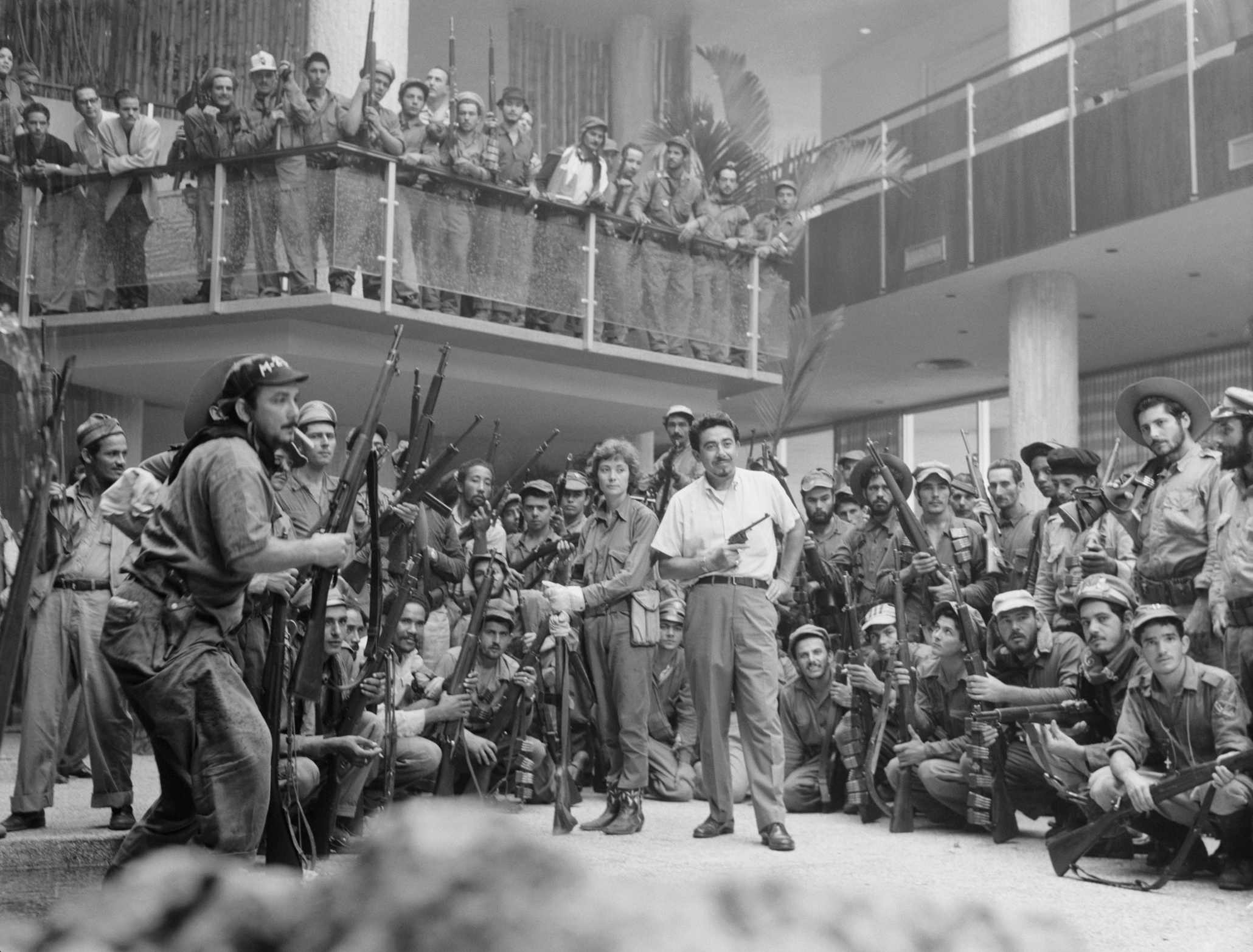
Cuban rebel soldiers in the Habana Hilton foyer, January 1959

The Cuban Revolution started as an uprising that resulted in the overthrow of the Fulgencio Batista government on 1 January 1959 by Fidel Castro and other revolutionary elements in the country. The Revolution began on 26 July 1953, when a group of armed guerrillas attacked the Moncada Barracks. From 1956 to 1959, Castro and his forces staged successful attacks on Batista garrisons in the Sierra Maestra mountains. Che Guevara and Raúl Castro helped to consolidate rebel political control in the forests and mountains through guerrilla fighting, building trust with campesinos, and severely punishing traitors and informers. The irregular and poorly armed rebels harassed the Batista forces in the forests and mountains of Oriente Province.

Batista's troops were defeated by Castro's fighters at the Battle of La Plata (11–21 July 1958). Although Batista's army gained a victory at the Battle of Las Mercedes (29 July–8 August 1958), the army commander Eulogio Cantillo allowed the rebels to escape back into the Sierra Maestra mountains. As the rebels emerged from the Sierra Maestra into more populated areas, they seized significant amounts of Dominican-made Cristóbal Carbines and hand grenades; these became the rebels' standard weapons. The final blow to Batista's government came during the Battle of Yaguajay (19–30 December 1958). After suffering a crucial defeat at the Battle of Santa Clara, Batista fled the country and Castro came into power.

=== Dominican Republic invasion attempt ===
Cuban military intervention abroad began on 14 June 1959 with an attempted invasion of the Dominican Republic by a mixed group of Cuban soldiers and Cuban-trained Dominican irregulars. The expeditionary force was massacred just hours after having disembarked.

Castro feared a possible attack from the Dominican Republic and was determined to acquire jet aircraft as a preventive measure: Cuba's ability to repel an air attack was very precarious, since the Dominicans possessed 40 jet aircraft whereas Cuba had only one. The Dominican Air Force had the theoretical ability to reach and bomb Havana within 3 hours.

=== Escambray rebellion ===
Militant anti-Castro groups, funded by exiles, by the Central Intelligence Agency (CIA) and by Rafael Trujillo's Dominican government, carried out armed attacks and set up guerrilla bases in the Escambray Mountains. This led to a failed rebellion, which lasted longer and involved more soldiers than the Cuban Revolution. Near 1,000 families were forcibly uprooted from the Escambray countryside, leaving the rebels without their habitat to support them; the uprooted men were sent to prisons or executed after trial.

=== Bay of Pigs Invasion ===
The Bay of Pigs Invasion (known as La Batalla de Girón in Cuba), was an unsuccessful attempt by a U.S.-trained force of Cuban exiles to invade southern Cuba with support from U.S. armed forces to overthrow the Cuban government of Fidel Castro. The plan was launched in April 1961, less than three months after John F. Kennedy assumed the presidency in the United States. The Cuban armed forces, trained and equipped by Eastern Bloc nations, defeated the exile combatants in three days. Bad Cuban-American relations were exacerbated the following year by the Cuban Missile Crisis.

=== Cuban Missile Crisis ===
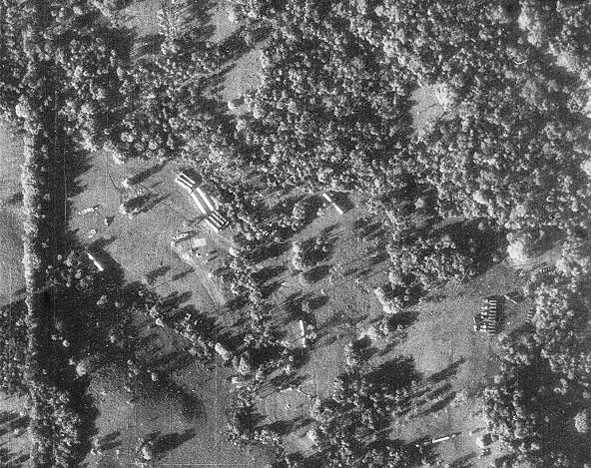
A reconnaissance photo of Cuba, showing Soviet nuclear missiles with their maintenance equipment. Their presence acted as a catalyst for the Cuban Missile Crisis.

The Cuban Missile Crisis (October Crisis in Cuba) was a confrontation between the United States and the Soviet Union over nuclear missiles that were deployed in Cuba and Turkey. The Russian missiles were placed both to protect Cuba from further attacks by the United States after the failed Bay of Pigs Invasion, and in response to the U.S. deploying Thor missiles with nuclear warheads on the Soviet border in Turkey.

The situation reached the crisis point when U.S. reconnaissance imagery revealed Soviet nuclear missile installations on the island, and ended fourteen days later when the Americans and Soviets each agreed to dismantle their installations, and the Americans agreed not to invade Cuba.

=== Congo Crisis ===
The Congo Crisis was a period of turmoil in the Congo that began with national independence from Belgium and ended with the seizing of power by Joseph Mobutu. During the Congo Crisis, a Cuban expedition led by Che Guevara trained the Simba rebels to fight against the weak central government of Joseph Kasa-Vubu and the forces of Mobutu Sese Seko. This would be Cuba's first military action in Africa. The rebellion failed, leading the Cuban mission to withdraw.

=== Sand War ===
In 1963, Cuba assisted Algeria in the Sand War against Morocco. Cuba sent 300–400 tank troops and some 40 Russian-built T-34 tanks, which engaged in combat.

=== Guinea-Bissau War of Independence ===
Some 40–50 Cubans fought against Portugal in Guinea-Bissau each year from 1966 until independence in 1974; several Cubans were killed in the field by Portuguese troops.

=== Bolivian campaign ===
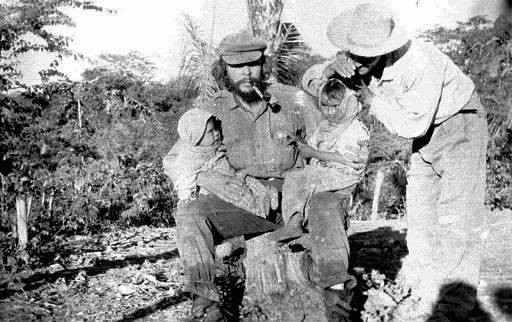
Guevara shortly before his death in Bolivia. During the 1960s, Cuba began to support a Communist insurgency in the country.

During the 1960s, the National Liberation Army began a Communist insurgency in Bolivia. The National Liberation Army was established and funded by Cuba and led by Che Guevara.

The National Liberation Army was defeated and Che Guevara was captured by the Bolivia government aided by the U.S. Central Intelligence Agency. Bolivian Special Forces were informed of the location of Guevara's guerrilla encampment. On 8 October 1967, the encampment was encircled, and Guevara was captured and later executed by Bolivian forces.

=== Eritrean War ===
Cubans trained Eritreans but later, in a political reversal, trained Ethiopian Marxist forces who were fighting against Eritreans.

=== War of Attrition ===
Cuba deployed 2,000 troops to support the Syrian forces fighting against Israel during the War of Attrition (November 1973–May 1974) that followed the Yom Kippur War (October 1973). Cuban tank units engaged in artillery duels with the Israelis in the Golan Heights. Precise Cuban casualty numbers are unknown.

=== Cuban intervention in Angola ===
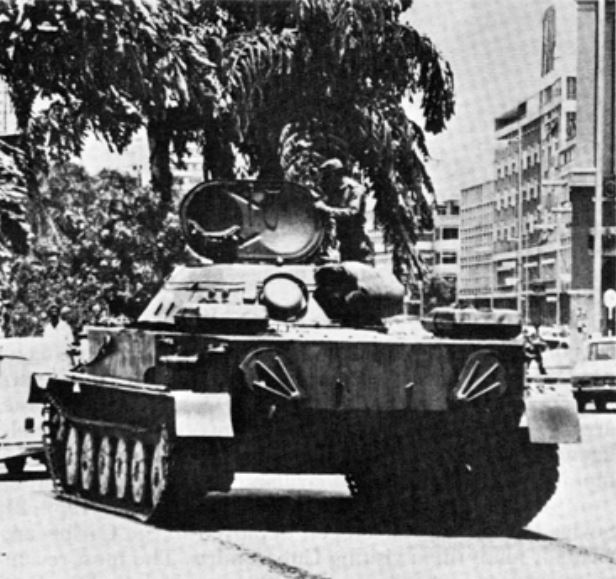
A Cuban-manned, Soviet-made PT-76 tank in Luanda, 1976

Between 1975 and 1991, the Cuban military provided support for the left wing MPLA movement in a series of civil wars. During these conflicts the MPLA emerged victorious due in part to the substantial aid received from Cuba.

The Angolan War of Independence was a struggle for control of Angola between guerilla movements and Portuguese colonial authority. Cuba supplied the People's Movement for the Liberation of Angola (MPLA) rebels with weapons and soldiers to fight. The Cuban military would fight alongside the MPLA in major battles.

The Angolan Civil War was a 27-year civil war that devastated Angola following the end of Portuguese colonial rule in 1974. The conflict was fought by the MPLA against UNITA and the National Liberation Front of Angola (FNLA). MPLA was aided by Cuba and the Soviet Union, and UNITA and FNLA were supported by South Africa, United States and Zaire. It became Africa's longest running conflict. Cuban forces were instrumental in the defeat of South African and Zairian troops. Cuban forces also defeated the FNLA and UNITA armies in conventional warfare and established MPLA control over most of Angola.

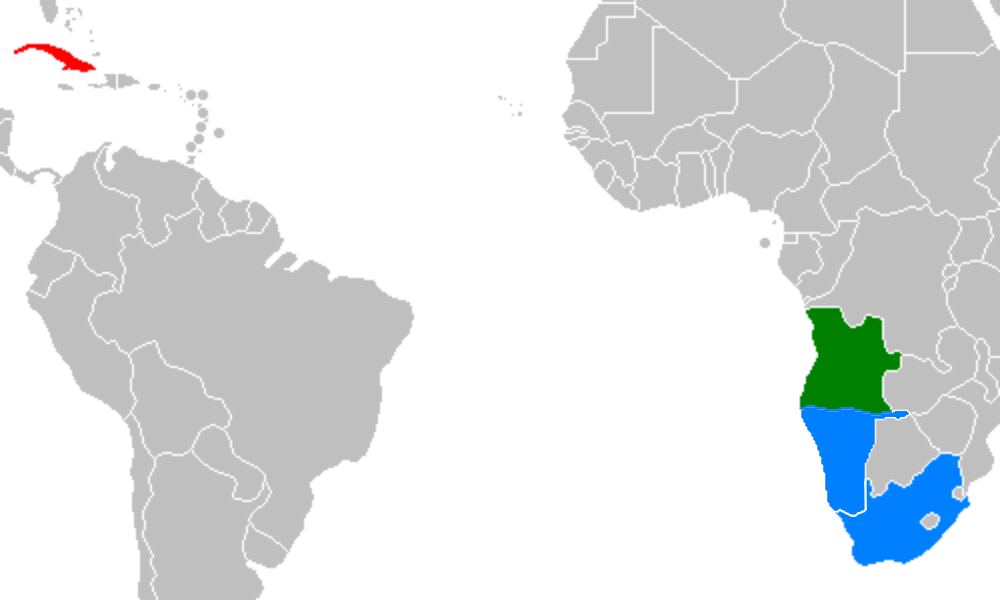
Location of Cuba (red), Angola (green), and South Africa (blue). Namibia is also in blue, but demarcated from the rest of South Africa, as it had been under South African control since 1915, and South African forces used Namibia as a base to enter Angola.

In 1987–88, South Africa again sent military forces to Angola, and several inconclusive battles were fought between Cuban and apartheid forces. Cuba, Angola and South Africa signed the Tripartite Accord on 22 December 1988, in which Cuba agreed to withdraw troops from Angola in exchange for South Africa withdrawing soldiers from Angola and South West Africa. Cuba suffered up to 18,000 casualties (2,000-3,000 dead and 15,000 wounded) during the Angolan intervention. Regular South African forces may have suffered only 1,000 dead, excluding losses among paramilitary units and other irregular formations.

Angola paid a huge cost for the conflict: 800,000 dead, 4 million displaced, a rural infrastructure and economy virtually destroyed, the majority of the population impoverished, almost two million facing a famine, and human rights abuses becoming the norm. Hundreds of thousands of anti-personnel mines were laid across the country and are still in place, causing thousands of deaths and mutilating 70,000 people.

=== Ogaden War ===
The Ogaden War was a conflict between Somalia and Ethiopia between 1977 and 1978. Fighting erupted in the Ogaden region as Somalia attempted to annex it. When the Soviet Union began to support the Ethiopian Derg government instead of the Somali government, other Communist nations followed. In late 1977, the Cuban military deployed 16,000 combat troops along with aircraft to support the Derg government and the USSR military advisors in the region.

By March 1978, following months of tank warfare, a combined force of Ethiopian and Cuban troops (led by Russian and Cuban officers) repulsed the enemy. The Somali army, which had taken a severe beating from Cuban artillery and air attacks, was destroyed as a fighting force. Cuban losses were 160 killed, 11 tanks and 3 planes.

=== Invasion of Grenada ===
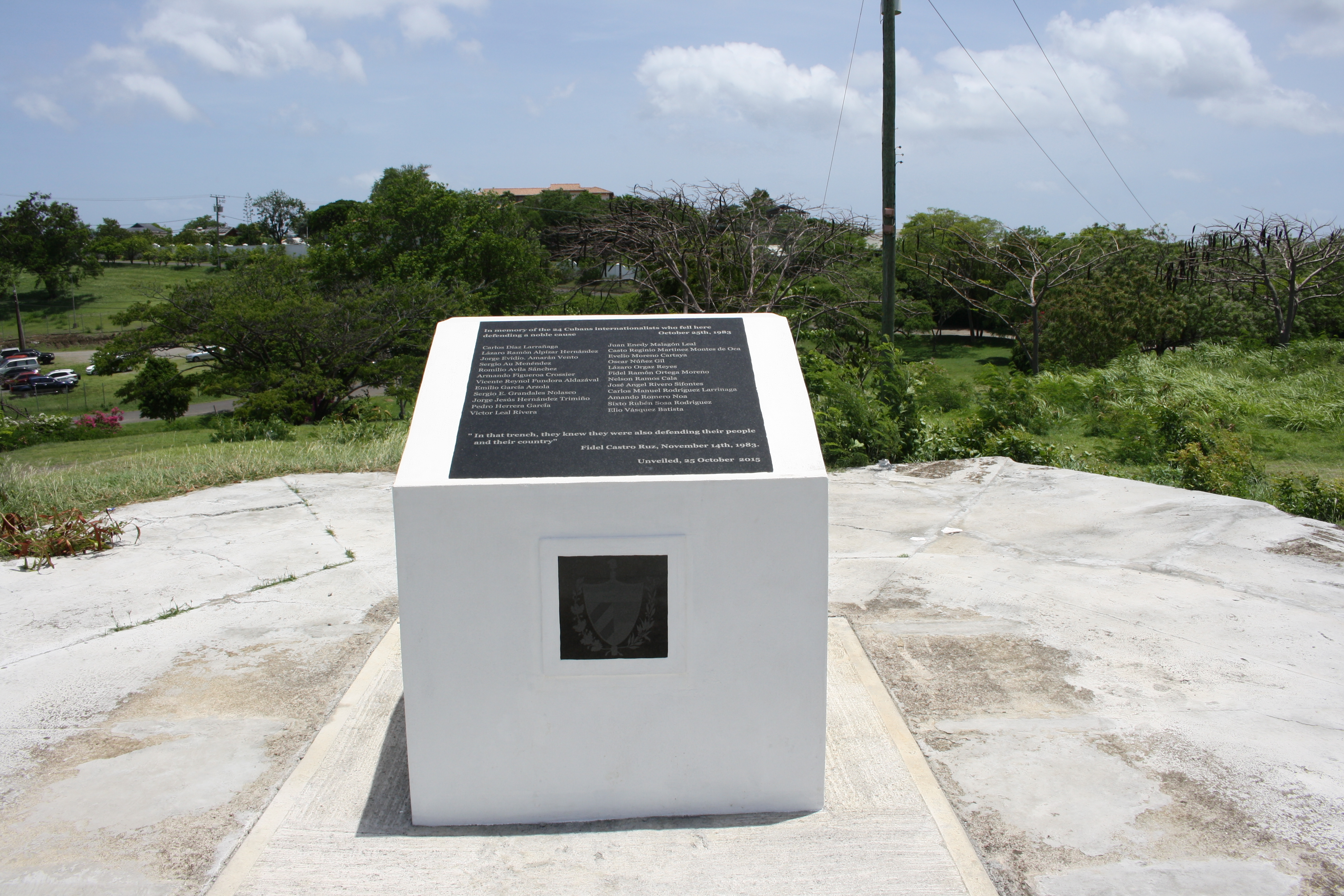
A war memorial to commemorate Cubans killed during the United States invasion of Grenada

A 748-person count of Cuban workers (all but 43 of whom were construction workers) was present in Grenada at the time of the invasion of Grenada by the U.S. in 1983. Cuba was involved in the construction of a civil airport in Saint John, Grenada. Cuban losses during the conflict were 24 killed (only 2 of whom were professional soldiers), 59 wounded, and 606 made prisoners (later repatriated to Cuba). In 2008, the Government of Grenada announced the construction of a monument to honor the Cubans killed during the invasion by Genelle Figuroa. At the time of the announcement the Cuban and Grenadian government are still seeking to locate a suitable site for the monument.

=== Salvadoran Civil War ===
The Salvadoran Civil War was fought by the El Salvador government waging a vicious crackdown against various left-wing rebels, as well as committing war crimes against civilians, one example of which being the El Mozote massacre. Cuba supplied the rebels with weapons and advisors.

=== Nicaraguan Civil War ===
During the Sandinista revolution and the following Civil War, Cuba gave aid and intelligence support to the Sandinista government of Daniel Ortega. The Sandinista government was fighting the American backed rebels (aka) Contras. The conflict ended with the 1990 presidential election where Ortega lost to Violeta Barrios de Chamorro.

== 21st century ==
=== Intervention in Venezuela ===
After months of political escalation, the U.S. intervened in Venezuela on 2026. Military operation codenamed "Operation Absolute Resolve" was carried out to capture Maduro and his wife Cilia. During the operation, strikes led by the U.S. killed 32 Cubans military troops. Cuba had a military presence of 46,000 members in Venezuela in order to assist Chávez's successor, Nicolás Maduro.

== See also ==
- Cuban military internationalism
- Foreign interventions by Cuba
- List of wars involving Cuba
