= Cuban National Army =

Armed forces of Cuba from 1902 to 1959

Cuban National Army (1902–1935) Cuban Constitutional Army (1935–1959)
- Ejército Nacional de Cuba (1902–1935); Ejército Constitucional de Cuba (1935–1959)
- Active: 1902–1959
- Country: Cuba
- Type: Ground forces
- Size: 80,000 (disputed) (1958)
- Engagements: War of 1912; 1952 Cuban coup d'état; Cuban Revolution; Attack on the Moncada Barracks; Operation Verano; Battle of Las Mercedes; Battle of La Plata; Battle of Yaguajay; Battle of Santa Clara

Commanders
- Notable commanders: Fulgencio Batista; Fernando Neugart; Alberto Herrera Franchi; Julio Sanguily Echarte; José Eleuterio Pedraza; Francisco Tabernilla Dolz; Manuel López Migoya; Genovevo Pérez Dámera; Ruperto Cabrera; Pedro Rodríguez Avila; Eulogio Cantillo; Martín Díaz Tamayo; José Rodríguez Calderón; Alberto del Rio Chaviano; Ramón Barquín; Joaquín Casillas; Alfredo Abon Lee

The Cuban National Army (Spanish: Ejército Nacional de Cuba, lit. 'National Army of Cuba'), from 1935 known as the Cuban Constitutional Army (Spanish: Ejército Constitucional de Cuba, lit. 'Constitutional Army of Cuba'), was the army of the Republic of Cuba from 1902 to 1959.

== History ==
The Cuban National Army was the army of the Republic of Cuba until 1959. It was dissolved in 1959 following the victory of the Rebel Army, the armed forces of the 26th of July Movement led by Fidel Castro. Following the victory of the Cuban Revolution in 1959, this army was superseded by the current Cuban Revolutionary Armed Forces.

The National Army represented the main means of repression during the military dictatorship of General Fulgencio Batista who ruled Cuba from 1952 to 1959 until his regime was overthrown by Castro's revolutionary forces. As of 1958, the army was composed of 40,849 officers and soldiers and the navy was composed of 6,963 members.

== Armament ==
=== Armored vehicles ===
- 8 Marmon Herrington CTMS-1TBI
- 24 M3A1 Stuarts
- 7 M4A3 (76) W HVSS General Sherman
- 15 Comet (A34)

=== Aircraft ===
- 29 Republic Thunderbolt F-47D
- 7 Piper PA-20 Pacer
- 5 Piper PA-18-135 Super Cub
- 8 Lockheed T-33 Shooting Star Land/lease
- 16 Douglas B-26B & C Invader Land/Lease
- 4 Piper PA-22-150 Tri Pacer
- 3 Piper Pa-22-160 Tri Pacer
- 1 Piper PA-23-160 Apache
- 1 Aero Commander 560
- 2 Bell 47G-2
- 1 Douglas TB-26 Land/lease
- 6 De Havilland Beavers DHC-2
- 4 Curtiss Commandos C-46
- 15 Hawker Sea Fury FB.11

=== Warships ===
- 3 - Tacoma-class frigates (1947-1973)
- 2 - PCE-842-class patrol craft (1947-1976)
- 1 - PC-461-class submarine chaser (1956-1961)
- 9 - SC-1-class submarine chasers (1918-1976)
- 1 - Leoncio Prado-class submarine chaser (1946-1976)
- 2 - Diez de Octubre-class gunboats (1911-1946)
- 1 - Patria-class gunboat (1911-1955)
- 1 - Cuba-class gunboat (1911-1971)
- 1 - Baire-class gunboat (1906-1942)
- 1 - Santa Clara-class gunboat (1911-1946)
- 2 - Habana-class cutters (1912-1946)
- 13 - USCG 83ft motor launches (1943-1976)
- 1 - General Juan Bruno Zayas-class presidential yacht (1914-1946)

== See also ==
- Military history of Cuba
