= Attack on El Uvero =

Engagement during the Cuban Revolution

- Part of the Cuban Revolution
Date	May 28, 1957
Location	El Uvero, Cuba
Result	Rebel victory: Rebels launch a counter-offensive

Belligerents
Republic of Cuba	26th of July Movement

Commanders and leaders
(Cuba) General Eulogio Cantillo (Cuba) General Alberto del Rio Chaviano	Fidel Castro; Che Guevara; Juan Almeida (WIA)

Strength
140 men	127 men

Casualties and losses
14 killed 19 wounded All surrendered	7 killed 8 wounded

The attack on El Uvero was an armed confrontation between the 26th of July Movement and the Cuban military on May 28, 1957, part of the Cuban Revolution. It was the first major confrontation between the 26th of July Movement, led by Fidel Castro, and the Cuban military, led by Fulgencio Batista, since the latter settled in Sierra Maestra.

== Battle ==
On May 28, 1957, Fidel Castro made the decision to attack a military garrison that was located in the coastal town of El Uvero, in Sierra Maestra. The Castro guerrillas then had 127 armed and trained combatants who had not yet openly engaged in combat.

The combat was particularly bloody because the rebels did not have concealed positions of attack and had to openly expose themselves. After two hours and forty-five minutes of intense fighting, the garrison surrendered. The guerrillas lost 7 men and had 8 wounded, among them Juan Almeida Bosque, while the Cuban military lost 14 men and had 19 wounded.

After the fighting had ceased, Fidel Castro ordered Che Guevara, then a rebel medic, to remain with the wounded. Guevara treated the wounded on both sides and made a "gentlemen's agreement" with the barracks doctor to leave the most seriously wounded on condition that they were respected when they were detained, a pact that the Cuban army respected.

== Sources ==
- El Combate de El Uvero, por Ernesto Che Guevara, Pasajes de la guerra revolucionaria
