= José Quevedo Pérez =

Cuban military officer and rebel (1925–2011)

- Born: 1 August 1925; Havana, Republic of Cuba
- Died: 20 April 2011 (aged 85); Miami, Florida, United States
- Education: El Morro Academy; University of Havana
- Military career
- Allegiance: Cuba
- Branch: Cuban Constitutional Army; 26th of July Movement; Cuban Revolutionary Army
- Rank: Brigadier General (Cuban Revolutionary Army); Major (Cuban Constitutional Army)
- Conflicts: Cuban Revolution; Operation Verano; Battle of La Plata

José Quevedo Pérez (1 August 1925 – 20 April 2011) was a Cuban soldier, commanding officer, and rebel, who served in the Cuban Constitutional Army, 26th of July Movement, and Cuban Revolutionary Army.

== Early life ==
Born in Havana, Cuba on 1 August 1925, José Quevedo Pérez grew up in a military environment, since his father served as an officer in the constitutional army until 1945 when he retired at the rank of Colonel.

In 1943, then eighteen year old Quevedo Pérez applied to El Morro Academy, from which he graduated three years later in 1946 with the rank of first lieutenant. By then he had also finished the first year of law school at the University of Havana, where he first met Fidel Castro.

== Military career ==
=== Cuban Constitutional Army ===
Quevedo Pérez did not take part in the coup d'état on March 10, 1952, that installed Fulgencio Batista as the new President of Cuba and began his dictatorship. Quevedo Pérez was visiting the United States Military Academy at West Point, New York during the coup d'état. Upon his return to Cuba he was appointed Chief of the San Ambrosio Barracks, the main supply base for the Constitutional Armed Forces. He was appointed to that position because he specialized in logistics as the result of a course he took in Fort Eustis, Virginia, in the Military Transportation Academy.

In those years he also worked as a professor at the Higher War School, located in the Castillo de Atarés.

Because of his prestige and leadership within the army, he was assigned to lead troops during Operation Verano the Cuban military offensive against 26 July Movement rebels in the summer of 1958. Then Major Quevedo Pérez commanded the 18th Battalion, which was surrounded and decimated by the rebels during the Battle of La Plata. After ten days of heavy fighting and stubborn resistance, he held talks with 26 July Movement comandante Fidel Castro and decided to switch sides and become a 26 July Movement rebel himself. "I never thought that the Rebel Army could defeat us, no matter how well it was prepared" Quevedo Pérez confessed years later. This dealt a demoralizing blow to the army and the regime of Fulgencio Batista.

=== 26th of July Movement & Cuban Revolutionary Army ===
As a trained army officer, Quevedo Perez advised the rebels of the 26th of July Movement, although he asked not to confront his colleagues that were still serving in the Constitutional Army. In a letter written in December 1958, Fidel Castro referred to Quevedo Perez as “one of the most respectable and honorable commanders of the constitutional Army” and a “spontaneous and legitimate standard bearer” of the revolutionary cause. After the Triumph of the Revolution on January 1st, 1959, he became an officer in the newly established Cuban Revolutionary Army and was appointed as the first Cuban military attaché to the Soviet Union.

In 1994 he was promoted to Brigadier General by Raúl Castro.

== Later life and death ==
After Retiring as a Brigadier General in the Cuban Revolutionary Army, Quevedo Pérez went to Miami in November 2003 to visit a son sick with cancer who died days after his arrival. He then decided to remain in the United States and stayed away from public life until mid-2006, when he made presentations at schools and appeared on television in Miami, distancing himself from the Cuban communist regime.

Quevedo Pérez died at his home in southwest Miami on 20 April 2011 around 3 p.m. of a Heart Attack at the age of 85 years old. In the morning he had attended a medical check-up with satisfactory results, according to his son, Roberto Quevedo Pérez. He is survived by his wife Berta Montesinos, then 77, and his children Roberto and Katia, in Miami, and in Cuba by his daughter Susana Quevedo.
