= Ramón Barquín =

Cuban dissident (1914–2008)

Ramón M. Barquín
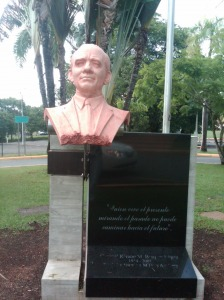
- Born: 12 May 1914; Cienfuegos, Cuba
- Died: 3 March 2008 (aged 93); Guaynabo, Puerto Rico
- Education: Cuban Military Academy, Superior War College, United States Strategic Intelligence School
- Spouse: Hilda Cantero (m. 1941; died 2004)
- Military career
- Allegiance: Republic of Cuba
- Branch: Cuban Constitutional Army
- Service years: 1933–1959
- Rank: Colonel
- Conflicts: Cuban Revolution

Ramón M. Barquín (12 May 1914 – 3 March 2008) was a Cuban military colonel and opponent of former President Fulgencio Batista. Barquín was jailed by the Batista government for leading a failed coup attempt in 1956. He later fled Cuba in 1960 following the 1959 takeover by Fidel Castro.

== Early life ==
Ramón M. Barquín was born in the city of Cienfuegos, Cuba, on 12 May 1914. Barquín enlisted in the Cuban military in 1933. He later graduated as a second lieutenant from the Cuban Military Academy and the Superior War College, which is located in Mexico. Additionally, Barquín also attended the United States Strategic Intelligence School.

Barquín married Hilda Cantero in 1941. She died in 2004 after more than sixty years of marriage.

== Career ==
Barquín taught in several Cuban military schools. He joined the Army as a private in 1933; was admitted in 1940 to Cuba's Military Academy the Escuela de Cadetes and was commissioned an officer in 1941. In 1943 he won a scholarship to study at the Mexican National War College (La Escuela Superior de Guerra) and upon graduation returned to Cuba to co-found the Cuban National War College. In 1950, President Prio appointed him Cuban Military Attache to the United States and concurrently to Canada, as well as to serve as Cuba's representative to the Inter-American Defense Board, in Washington, DC. He served in this capacity from 1950 until 1956 and rose through the military ranks to colonel and was listed to be promoted to general in 1956. Barquín would also serve as the director of military education of the Cuban Army.

Barquín was elected to be vice chief of staff of the Inter-American Defense Board. and for his work there the U.S. awarded Barquín the Legion of Merit in 1955, the highest Congressional award bestowed on foreign military personnel. He and his wife were regulars among the Washington social scene during the 1950s.

Barquín was ordered back to Cuba in 1956 by President Fulgencio Batista to carry out an assessment of the Dominican Republic's military capabilities to attack Cuba. He traveled to the Dominican Republic as the Cuban Delegate to the Special Inter-American Conference at Ciudad Trujillo on Submarine Platforms Preservation in March 1956 to covertly accomplish his mission. At the time, Batista and Dominican dictator Rafael Trujillo were feuding over several political issues. Batista was highly unpopular among the Cuban people at the time due to his suspension of the Constitution, his failure to call new elections and his oppression of political dissidents. By contrast, Barquín was a very popular military Colonel. Batista had expected Barquín's unconditional support but Barquin felt compelled instead to return Cuba to a democratic regime.

Barquín worked quickly to try to overthrow the unpopular Batista following his return to Cuba. In April 1956, Barquín launched what became known as a "the conspiracy of the pure" (a reference to the spotless records of the conspiring officers) to remove the President from power. Barquín led hundreds of Cuban Army officers in an attempted coup d'état to overthrow Batista, who was backed by the United States government. The coup attempt quickly failed to topple to the government. The leaders of the uprising, including Barquín, were rapidly arrested and court martialed from the military. Barquín was sentenced to six years in prison on the Isle of Pines for his part in the conspiracy. (Some reports say that he was sentenced to eight years in jail.) The Isle of Pines is located south of the large main island of Cuba. (It was renamed the Isle of Youth in 1978.)

== 1959 Cuban Revolution ==
President Batista purged the military officers of supporters of Barquín and the coup attempt. However, the failure of Barquín's 1956 coup attempt did not halt opposition to the Batista government. As a result of the failed coup the Army was purged of its top officers and a vacuum of power ensued that increased the possibilities to opposers like the 26th of July Movement. Fidel Castro landed in western Cuba and launched his guerrilla war against the government just six months after the coup attempt. The new military officers whom Batista had installed following his military purges were unable to cope with the Castro rebels, who numbered only about 300 regular troops backed by peasant volunteers. The Cuban military was one of the largest in Latin America at the time.

Castro quickly gained territory and support from Cubans. It appeared that Castro would topple Batista by 1958. The United States, seeking to stop Castro, pressured Batista to release Barquín from prison. but this is did not happen. However, when leaving for exile on New Year's Eve, Batista gave strict orders to General Eulogio Cantillo, Chief of the Military Junta, to not release Barquín and his officers from Isla de Pinos and to convene the Supreme Court to order Chief Justice Piedra as president. When this scheme collapsed because the Cuban Supreme Court instead recognized Manuel Urrutia as the legitimate president, Colonel Barquín was released from prison late in the evening of 1 January 1959, the same day that Batista fled into exile to the Dominican Republic. Barquin flew to Havana and took command of the Cuban Army at Camp Columbia from General Cantillo. In the afternoon of 1 January the Cuban Supreme Court had ruled that Manuel Urrutia, proposed by Castro's 26 July Movement, was the legitimate president of Cuba.

Cantillo had ordered an immediate ceasefire to the government troops fighting Castro's forces as soon Batista fled and Barquin maintained it as he took control of the Cuban Military. He attempted to contact Castro directly, but was unable to reach him since he was still in western Oriente Province. Cuban rebel leader Camilo Cienfuegos arrived at Camp Columbia on 2 January 1959. Cienfuegos had orders to assume control of the nation's military. Barquín did nothing to stop Cienfuegos, since his orders had been signed by Manuel Urrutia, whom the Cuban Supreme Court had recognized as the new Cuban president. Barquín "...saluted the insurgent 'Army of Liberation' and handed command (a camp and military fortress) to Camilo Cienfuegos...", according to the Cambridge History of Latin America. Fidel Castro arrived in the city of Havana one week later. Needless to say, this also averted a potentially significant amount of bloodshed in what could have been the Battle of Havana.

Barquín was initially a supporter of Castro's land reforms. However, he soon became disillusioned with Castro's Communist ideology and Castro's violation of internationally accepted human rights. Castro's brother, Raúl Castro, urged Barquín to leave Cuba in some capacity after realizing that Barquín was too popular a figure in Cuban society to imprison again. He was initially sent as a Cuban ambassador to a special study mission in Western Europe, which removed him from Cuban domestic affairs. However, in mid-1960 Barquín resigned his diplomatic post and left for exile in the United States, along with other moderates. He never returned again to his native Cuba.

== Exile ==
In an 25 October 1960, interview with the Washington Post, Barquín announced that he was actively supporting the People's Revolutionary Movement, which sought to overthrow Castro. He described the MRP as a left wing, non-Communist movement which sought to restore trade unions, civil liberties, redistribute wealth through taxation, and restore private enterprise. He also accused the Castro government of "...trying to create in Cuba an American Hungary..." in the same interview, referring to the failed Hungarian Revolution of 1956.

Barquin became the military coordinator for the MRP and established a training camp for 25 of its members in a rented facility in Homestead, Florida. The recruits included a number of supporters and former staff members of Rebel Major Huber Matos Benitez, including Jose Dionisio Suarez Esquivel, who escaped from El Morro prison on 8 October 1960, after being convicted of treason against the Cuban Revolution. They also included Ramon Barquin Cantero, his teenage son, Luis Posada Carriles, Alfredo Cepero, Jorge Beruff, Raul Lora and many others. Most of the recruits left the camp to join the 2506 Brigade for the failed Bay of Pigs invasion.

Barquín and his family briefly lived in Miami, Florida, which has a large Cuban exile community vehemently opposed to Castro. However, Barquín soon moved permanently to San Juan, Puerto Rico, in 1961. where he established a number of schools and other institutions. These facilities which he helped to found included two K-12 military school, known as the American Military Academy and American Academy, the Atlantic University, a series of summer camps, and a civic education institute called Instituto de Formacion Democratica or Student Parent Mock Election in English. The government of Puerto Rico awarded Barquín the Educator of the Year award in 1995 for his work on improving education on the island, among more than one hundred other prestigious awards during his lifetime in exile.

Barquín authored five books, all written in Spanish, on the subjects of education and history. His last book, Mis Dialogos con Fidel, Raul, Camilo y El Che, has been released after his death in 2009. He also became a marathon runner at the age of 60. He competed in the New York Marathon eleven different times and came in second for his age group in his first race. He won the 80-year-plus age group in the 1994 New York Marathon. Altogether, Barquín ran in almost 20 marathons in total.

== Death ==
Ramón Barquín died of complications from leukemia at his home in Guaynabo, Puerto Rico, on 3 March 2008, at the age of 93. His funeral was held in San Juan, Puerto Rico.

He was survived by his daughter, Lilliam Consuegra of San Juan; his son, Ramón C. Barquín of Bethesda, Maryland; six grandchildren, among them another Ramon C. Barquin; and nine great-grandchildren. His wife, Hilda Barquín, to whom he had been married for 63 years, died in 2004.
