= Operation Verano =

Military Offensive of the Cuban Revolution

- Part of the Cuban Revolution
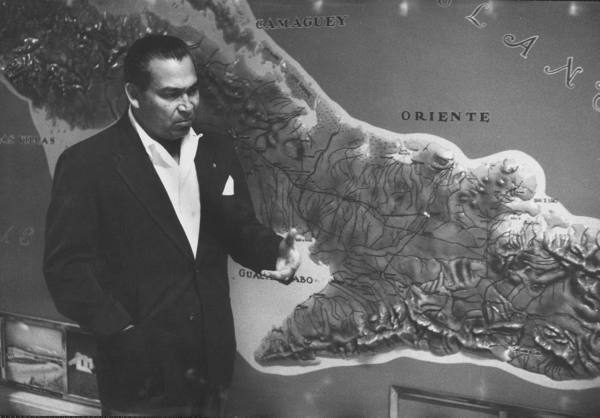
- Fulgencio Batista overlooking a map of the Sierra Maestra, where the 26th of July Movement was hiding.
Date	28 June 1958 – 8 August 1958 (1 month, 1 week and 4 days)
Location	Sierra Maestra hills, Cuba
Result	Rebel victory: The rebels launch a counter-offensive

Belligerents
Cuba	26th of July Movement

Commanders and leaders
(Cuba) General Eulogio Cantillo (Cuba) General Alberto del Rio Chaviano (Cuba) Colonel Ángel Sánchez Mosquera (Note: For a brief description of what he did use command f in Camilo Cienfuegos.) (Cuba) Major José Quevedo Pérez (Note: He served as a Major in Batista's army from 1953 to July 21st 1958, where he then talked to Castro and subsequently defected to his guerrilla army, serving Castro from July 21st 1958 to January 1st 1959 (the remaining duration of the revolutionary war).)	Fidel Castro; Che Guevara; Raúl Castro; Camilo Cienfuegos; Major José Quevedo Pérez (Note: Served Castro from July 21st 1958 until January 1st 1959 (the remaining duration of the revolutionary war).) René Ramos Latour †

Strength
12,000 men	300 men

Casualties and losses
207 killed 30 wounded 433 captured	27 killed 50 wounded

Operation Verano ([beˈɾano], "Operation Summer") was the name given to the summer offensive in 1958 by the Batista government during the Cuban Revolution, known to the rebels as La Ofensiva. The offensive was designed to crush Fidel Castro's revolutionary army, which had been growing in strength in the area of the Sierra Maestra mountains since their arrival in Cuba on board the Granma yacht in December 1956. The offensive was met with resistance, notably at the Battle of La Plata and the Battle of Las Mercedes, and failed in its objective. The failure left the Cuban army dispirited and demoralized. Castro viewed it as a victory and soon launched his own offensive.

== Background ==
Throughout 1957, Fidel Castro's small band of revolutionaries operated out of a mountain base, staging hit and run attacks on the government of Batista. The Cuban army and political leadership did not take these attacks seriously for a long time. The attitude of Batista changed in the Spring of 1958 as Castro started to gain international recognition and he called for a General Strike. Batista decided to destroy Castro's small army, so in May 1958, General Eulogio Cantillo was given the mission.

Cantillo's plan was to use nearly all of the Cuban regular army (24 battalions or about 20,000 men) to surround the Sierra Maestra, set up a blockade to prevent weapons from going in, and then attack from the north with 14 battalions. Given the true strength of Castro's forces (about 300 fighters), Cantillo's plan seemed like overkill, but the Cuban military vastly overestimated Castro's true strength as between 1,000 and 2,000 veteran guerrillas.

Batista refused to allocate so many forces to the attack, instead Cantillo was given just 14 battalions (12,000 men), of which 7,000 were new recruits with little training and little incentive to actually fight (in actual battle, the new recruits would rarely fight and often did nothing). Given the fact that Batista would lose control of the country because the offensive failed, this decision was a bad one. Yet another bad decision was to divide operational control between two generals, Cantillo and the ineffective (but politically well connected) Alberto del Rio Chaviano. Chaviano did nothing to help in the campaign and frequently complained about Cantillo's failures.

Castro's troops knew the terrain well, and they set up mine fields and built defensive positions along the major routes through which they expected the army to attack. Castro had excellent knowledge of where the army was and what they were planning. He also had the support of local peasants, who assisted in the transmission of information on Cantillo's troops and risked their lives to hide rebel supplies.

== The Engagements ==
The first attack was on June 28, 1958, with an attack that moved out of the Estrada Palma Sugar Mill (see the map). This attack was halted by an ambush from Che Guevara's troops. Armored cars that moved off the road ran into a previously laid mine field. The army began to retreat while Che's troops continued to fire at them. The army lost 86 men, Che's troops lost 3.

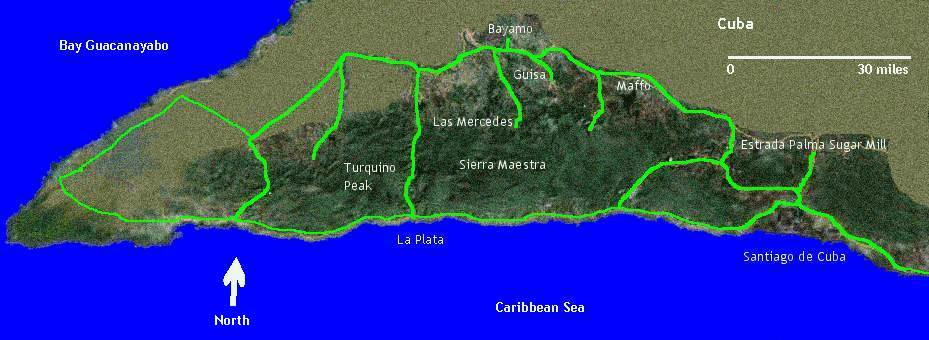
Map Showing Key Locations of the Cuban Revolution, 1958.

On July 11, the army landed Battalion 18 at the mouth of the La Plata River. This action is sometimes called the Battle of La Plata or the battle of Jigüe. The idea was to surround Castro's mountain defences at Turquino Peak. The Cuban soldiers (most were new recruits) again were ambushed by Castro's guerrillas and were soon surrounded and immobilized. A second battalion was landed to try to help but they were halted at the beach. A third battalion (number 17) was sent to help but they ran into another part of Castro's forces and did not push through the road blocks. After more than a week, on July 21, Battalion 18 surrendered: 40 dead, 30 wounded, and 240 became prisoners. Castro's troops lost just three of their own men.

General Cantillo decided to withdraw Battalion 17 but he planned to make the withdrawal a trap if Castro chose to follow the retreating soldiers. This resulted in the Battle of Las Mercedes. Castro's troops, for the first time, were caught by the trap and more than 70 were killed in the first two days of fighting, including a senior rebel leader, René Ramos Latour. Castro managed to get his army out of the trap by opening negotiations with General Cantillo and Batista. By August 8, all of Castro's forces had escaped and the government's offensive was over.

== Aftermath ==
By trying and failing to destroy Castro's guerrilla army, the Batista government looked weak and ineffective, devastating the morale of the Cuban army. Most of the junior officers, after a strenuous fight, were disgusted that Cantillo had negotiated. Castro's success had come just when the regular army, after having fought well for the first time in the campaign, seemed to finally have the advantage. Uplifted by the government's failure, Castro went on the offensive and within 4 months, he had taken control of Cuba.

== Sources ==
- The Spirit Of Moncada by Larry Bockman (Major, USMC) 1984.
- Jeffrey S. Dixon, Meredith Reid Sarkees, A Guide to Intrastate Wars: An Examination of Civil, Regional, and Intercommunal Wars, 1816–2014, CQ Press, 2015
- Analysis of the Military Strategy and Warfare Principles of Che Guevara and Fidel Castro During the Cuban Revolution by Major Monte H. Callen, July 8th 1985
