= Jobabó Slave Revolt =

First slave revolt in Cuba

Date	1532 or 1533
Location	Caobilla gold mine, Jobabó, Cuba
Result	Rebellion suppressed. Leaders executed.

Belligerents
Slaves	Viceroyalty of New Spain

Casualties and losses
100%	

The Jobabó Slave Revolt, or the Mahogany Rebellion, was the first uprising of black slaves on the island of Cuba. In 1532, there were approximately 500 black slaves in Cuba. This slave rebellion happened at the Caobilla gold mine in the town of Jobabó. The uprising was suppressed, and as a warning to others, the severed heads of its leaders were placed on stakes and exhibited at the city’s entrance. The city government has expressed its wishes that Jobabó be added to UNESCO's Slave Route Project.
