= René Ramos Latour =

Commander under Fidel Castro during the Cuban Revolution

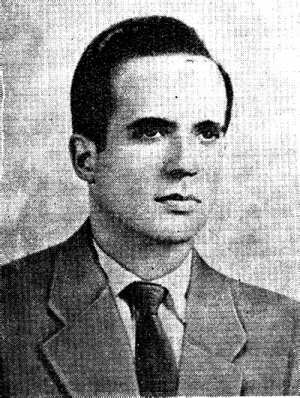
- René Ramos Latour prior to the Cuban Revolution
- Born: 12 May 1932; Antilla, Cuba
- Died: 30 July 1958 (aged 26); Oriente Province, Cuba

René Ramos Latour (12 May 1932 – 30 July 1958) was a Cuban revolutionary and military commander under the command of Fidel Castro during the Cuban Revolution. He was killed in action against the Cuban Army during the Battle of Las Mercedes.
