= Battle of La Plata =

Military action during the Cuban revolution

- Part of Operation Verano and the Cuban Revolution
Date	11 July - 21 July 1958
Location	Sierra Maestra mountains, Cuba
Result	Rebel victory

Belligerents
Cuba	26th of July Movement

Commanders and leaders
(Cuba) Gen. Eulogio Cantillo (Cuba) Maj. José Quevedo Pérez	Fidel Castro

Strength
Battalion 17; Battalion 18; 1 helicopter	Unknown

Casualties and losses
71 killed & wounded 400+ captured	3 killed

The Battle of La Plata (11-21 July 1958) was part of Operation Verano, the summer offensive of 1958 launched by the Batista government during the Cuban Revolution. The battle resulted from a complex plan created by Cuban General Cantillo to directly attack Castro's mountain base in the Sierra Maestra. The battle ended with the humiliating surrender of the assault battalion and the loss of some 500 Cuban army soldiers (killed, wounded, and captured).

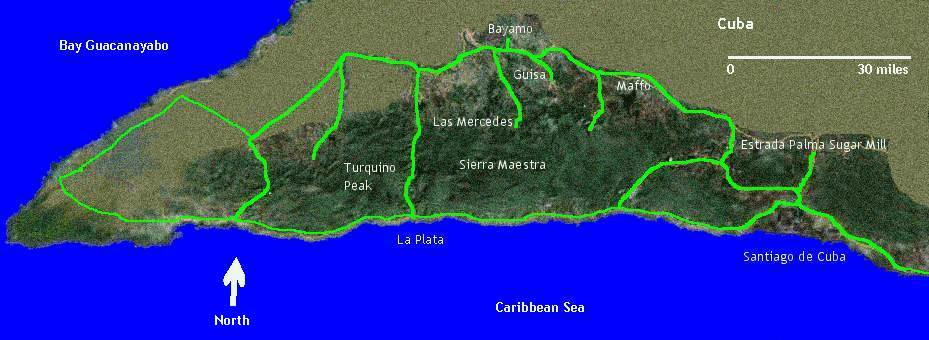
Map showing key locations of the Cuban Revolution, 1958

== Background ==
General Cantillo's plan was to bring a direct attack on Castro's base in the Sierra Maestra. Earlier attacks into the mountains from the north and east had failed miserably, as the attackers had run into ambushes and minefields.

This attack would be different, a surprise amphibious assault from the sea by Cuban army Battalion 18, under the command of Major Jose Quevedo. Once Battalion 18 had landed, Battalion 17 was to move into the Sierra Maestra and attack Castro's base from the north.

== The battle ==
The landing took place on the 11 July 1958, at La Plata, a tiny village where La Plata River and Jigüe River reach the sea. The landing-party came ashore successfully and the battalion headed in towards the mountains. Castro's forces took positions on either side of the advancing soldiers and suddenly attacked. Within half an hour, Battalion 18 was surrounded and under attack from all directions. The Cuban soldiers proceeded to dig trenches and then waited for help.

General Cantillo ordered 200 men that had been held in reserve to land at a nearby beach west of La Plata so they could attack Castro's guerrillas from behind. But this sea attack was driven off by machine gun fire and so, the reserves ended up landing at La Plata behind Battalion 18 where they could do nothing useful.

Next, Battalion 17 was ordered to attack into the mountains. Once again, a small detachment of Castro's skilled guerrillas stopped the move by the Cuban army into the Sierra Maestra by using road blocks, mines, and sniper fire.

Meanwhile, Castro tried to convince the commander of the surrounded Battalion 18 to surrender, using propaganda broadcasts over loudspeakers and personal letters. Major Jose Fernando Quevedo, though a former classmate of Castro, resisted the call to surrender for days. Finally, on the 21st of July Quevedo surrendered his command.

== Results of the battle ==
Battalion 18 lost 71 of its men killed and wounded during the course of the battle. The rest, some 240 men, surrendered. All told, Castro's troops captured some 400 Cuban Army soldiers (although they later turned them over to the Red Cross) along with hundreds of weapons and nearly a ton of ammunition.

The battle demonstrated, yet again, the virtual inability of Batista's Cuban Army to launch an attack. Even when surrounded and under fire, the Cuban soldiers of Battalion 18 did nothing more than hold their position and wait for someone else to help them. With the lives of their fellow soldiers on the line, Battalion 17 staged an ineffective attack into the mountains and then stopped. The end of the battle left Battalion 17 halted south of Las Mercedes lake in the mountains. Their withdrawal would lead to the Battle of Las Mercedes (29 July-8 August 1958).

Major Jose F. Quevedo stayed with Castro and eventually switched sides, joining with Castro and working against the Batista government. He later wrote two books (published in Cuba) about the battle and the last six months of the revolution.

== See also ==
- Battle of Las Mercedes 29 July-8 August 1958
- Battle of Yaguajay 19–30 December 1958

== Sources ==
- The Spirit Of Moncada by Larry Bockman (Major, USMC) 1984.
- Battle of Jigüe by Terrence Cannon
- Interview with Colonel Quevedo published in The Militant (a Communist journal), 1996.
