= Alberto del Rio Chaviano =

Cuban brigadier general (1914–1978)

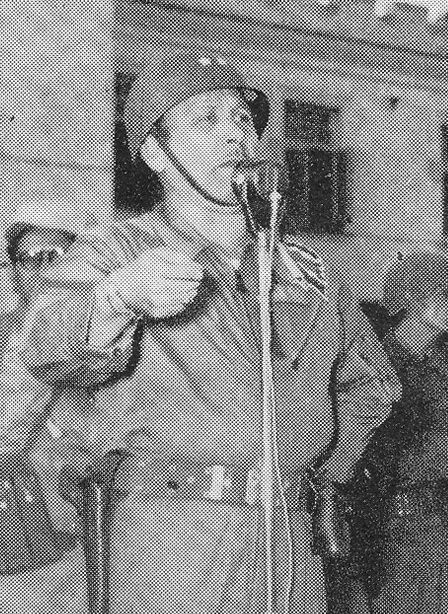
- Nickname: "Jackal of the East"
- Born: 4 July 1915; Vueltas, Las Villas, Cuba
- Died: 26 April 1978 (aged 62) Miami, Florida, United States
- Allegiance: Republic of Cuba
- Branch: Cuban Constitutional Army
- Service years: 1933–1958
- Rank: Brigadier General (1957)
- Commands: Chief of Regiment No.1 Antonio Maceo (Oriente province) (1952); Chief of the Army in the Oriente province (1952); Chief of the Army in the Las Villas province (1958)
- Conflicts: Cuban Revolution; Attack on Moncada Barracks; Operation Verano
- Awards: Cruz Maceo
- Spouse: Daisy Collado

Alberto Roberto del Rio Chaviano was a Cuban brigadier general who served on the side of Fulgencio Batista's dictatorship of Cuba (1952–1959). He studied high school at the Instituto de Santa Clara. In November 1933, he entered the Cuban National Army as a soldier. In 1951, he was retired with the rank of captain from the Army by the government of Carlos Prío. After Batista’s coup d'état on 10 March 1952, he was promoted from captain to colonel. He was the chief colonel of the Moncada Barracks when Fidel Castro and his group attacked the barracks on July 26, 1953. He had an essential role to play in the military during Operation Verano. He played an important role in the defense of the Batista regime during the Cuban Revolution. During the dictatorship of Batista, he was put in charge of the Cuban Army in the region of Oriente in which Raúl Castro's guerrilla unit operated, and later in the Las Villas province Batista ordered his arrest for treason and he fled to the Dominican Republic on December 27, 1958. In that country he had a cattle ranch that was expropriated by the Dominican dictator Rafael Trujillo, and emigrated to the United States where he was a Spanish teacher. In 1963, he lived in Texas. He died of marrow cancer in the United States in 1978.
