= Battle of Las Mercedes =

Battle during the Cuban Revolution

- Part of Operation Verano and the Cuban Revolution
Date	29 July – 8 August 1958
Location	Sierra Maestra mountains, Cuba
Result	Government victory: The rebels were successfully ambushed and forced to retreat.; The rebels win propaganda victory by escaping.

Belligerents
Cuba	26th of July Movement

Commanders and leaders
Gen. Eulogio Cantillo	Fidel Castro; René Ramos Latour †; Che Guevara

Units involved
Battalion 17	Unknown

Strength
1,500+ men	Unknown

Casualties and losses
32 killed 50 captured	70 killed

The Battle of Las Mercedes (29 July – 8 August 1958) was the last battle which occurred during the course of Operation Verano, the summer offensive of 1958 launched by the Batista military dictatorship during the Cuban Revolution against the nationalist independence Cuban rebels of the 26th of July Movement.

The battle was a trap, designed by Cuban General Eulogio Cantillo to lure Fidel Castro's guerrillas into a place where they could be surrounded and destroyed. The battle ended with a cease-fire which Castro proposed and which Cantillo accepted. During the cease-fire, Castro's forces escaped back into the mountains. The battle, though technically a victory for the Cuban army, left the army dispirited and demoralized. Castro viewed the result as a victory and soon launched his own offensive.

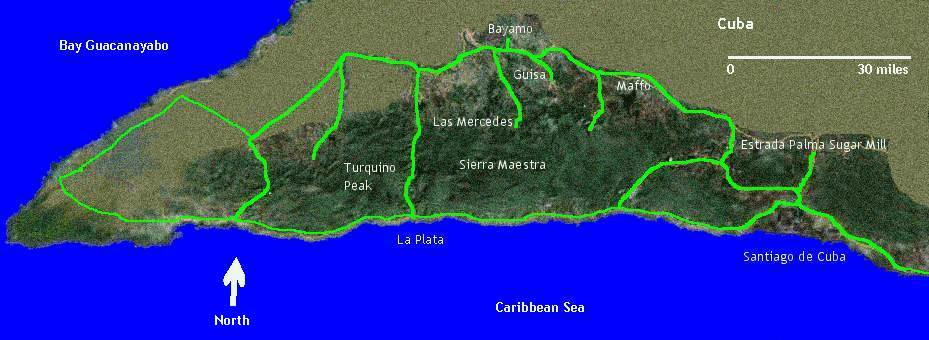
Map Showing Key Locations of the Cuban Revolution, 1958.

== Background ==
Earlier in the month, an amphibious assault from sea by the Cuban army Battalion 18 was crushed by Castro's forces at the Battle of La Plata. Battalion 18 was surrounded and sniped at by the rebel forces. General Cantillo ordered Battalion 17 to cross over the Sierra Maestra to come to the aid of Battalion 18. However, Castro's troops were able to block the road and prevent any relief for the surrounded soldiers. After 10 days of fighting, Battalion 18 surrendered. This left Battalion 17 in an exposed position.

== The battle ==
Battalion 17 began its pull back on the 29 July 1958. Castro sent a column of men under René Ramos Latour to ambush the retreating soldiers. They attacked the advance guard and killed some 30 soldiers but then came under attack from previously undetected Cuban forces. Latour called for help and Castro came to the battle scene with his own column of men. Castro's column also came under fire from another group of Cuban soldiers that had secretly advanced up the road from the Estrada Palma Sugar Mill.

As the battle heated up, General Cantillo called up more forces from nearby towns and some 1,500 troops started heading towards the fighting. However, this force was halted by a column under Che Guevara's command. While some critics accuse Che for not coming to the aid of Latour, Major Bockman argues that Che's move here was the correct thing to do. Indeed, he called Che's tactical appreciation of the battle "brilliant".

By the end of July, Castro's troops were fully engaged and in danger of being wiped out by the vastly superior numbers of the Cuban army. He had lost 70 men, including René Latour, and both he and the remains of Latour's column were surrounded. The next day, Castro requested a cease-fire with General Cantillo, even offering to negotiate an end to the war. This offer was accepted by General Cantillo for reasons that remain unclear.

Batista sent a personal representative to negotiate with Castro on the 2 August. The negotiations yielded no result but during the next six nights, Castro's troops managed to slip away unnoticed. On the 8 August when the Cuban army resumed its attack, they found no one to fight.

== Aftermath ==
Castro's remaining forces had escaped back into the mountains, and Operation Verano had effectively ended in failure for the Batista government.

== See also ==
- Battle of Yaguajay
