= Jobabo =

- Municipality
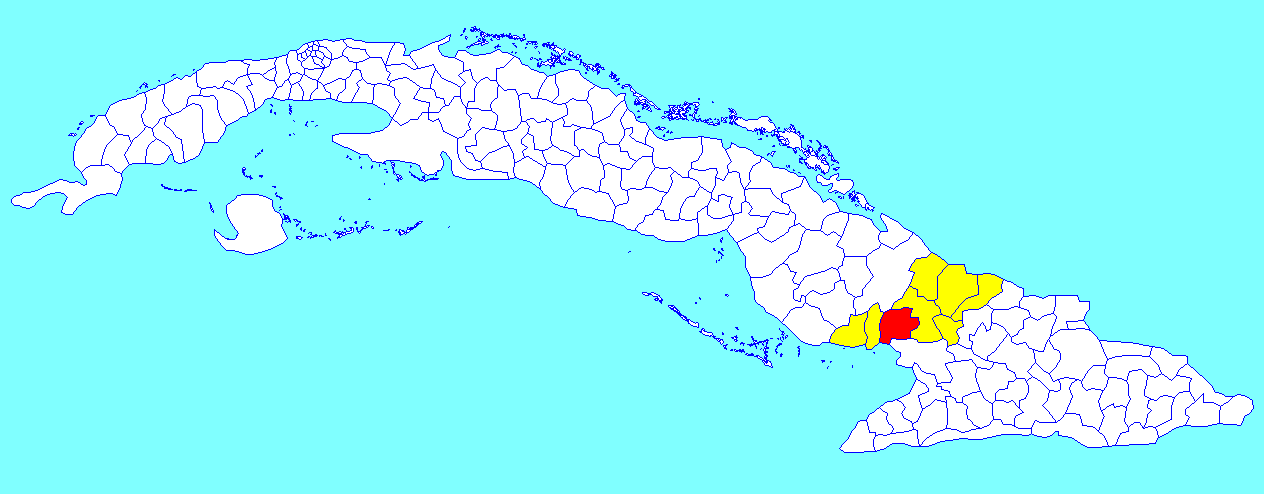
- Jobabo municipality (red) within Las Tunas Province (yellow) and Cuba
- Coordinates: 20°54′28″N 77°16′59″W
- Country: Cuba
- Province: Las Tunas

Area
  - Total: 884 km^{2} (341 sq mi)
- Elevation: 50 m (160 ft)

Population (2022)
  - Total: 40,345
  - Density: 45.6/km^{2} (118/sq mi)
- Time zone: UTC-5 (EST)
- Area code: +53-31
- Website: https://www.jobabo.gob.cu/

Jobabo is a municipality and town in the Las Tunas Province of Cuba. It is located in the southern part of the province, 34 km (21 mi) south of Las Tunas, the provincial capital.

== Overview ==
Jobabo is named from the taino word jobabol, meaning "a place where many jobo trees grow".

== Demographics ==
In 2022, the municipality of Jobabo had a population of 40,345. With a total area of 884 km^{2} (341 sq mi), it has a population density of 46/km^{2} (120/sq mi).

== See also ==
- Municipalities of Cuba
- List of cities in Cuba
