= Battle of Yaguajay =

1958 battle of the Cuban Revolution

- Part of the Cuban Revolution
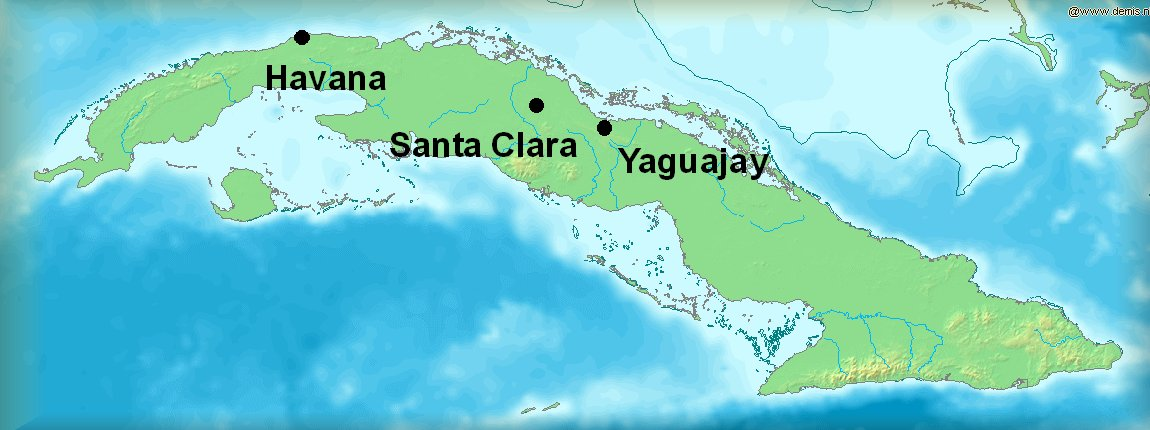
- The places of the last three decisive stages of the revolution
Date	19 – 30 December 1958
Location	Yaguajay, Cuba
Result	Rebel victory: Rebels continue their advance to Santa Clara.

Belligerents
Cuba	26th of July Movement

Commanders and leaders
Capt. Alfredo Abon Lee	Camilo Cienfuegos

Strength
250 men	450–500 men 1 tank (homemade)

Casualties and losses
Unknown	Unknown

The Battle of Yaguajay (19 – 30 December 1958) was a decisive victory for the Cuban Revolutionaries over the soldiers of the Batista government near the city of Santa Clara in Cuba during the Cuban Revolution.

== Background ==
In 1958, Fidel Castro ordered his revolutionary army to go on the offensive against the army of Fulgencio Batista. While Castro led one force against Guisa, Masó and other towns, another major offensive was directed at the capture of the city of Santa Clara, the capital of what was then Las Villas Province.

Three columns were sent against Santa Clara under the command of Che Guevara, Jaime Vega, and Camilo Cienfuegos. Vega's column was caught in an ambush and completely destroyed. Guevara's column took up positions around Santa Clara (near Fomento). Cienfuegos's column directly attacked a local army garrison at Yaguajay. Initially numbering just 60 men out of Castro's hardened core of 230, Cienfuegos's group had gained many recruits as it crossed the countryside towards Santa Clara, eventually reaching an estimated strength of 450 to 500 fighters.

== The battle ==
The garrison consisted of some 250 men under the command of a Cuban captain of Chinese ancestry, Alfredo Abon Lee. The attack seems to have started around December 19th.

Convinced that reinforcements would be sent from Santa Clara, Lee put up a determined defense of his post. The guerrillas repeatedly attempted to overpower Lee and his men, but failed each time. By 26 December Camilo Cienfuegos had become quite frustrated; it seemed that Lee could not be overpowered, nor could he be convinced to surrender. In desperation, Cienfuegos tried using a homemade tank against Lee's position.

The "tank" was actually a large tractor encased in iron plates with attached makeshift flamethrowers on top. It, too, proved unsuccessful. Finally, on December 30, Lee ran out of ammunition and was forced to surrender his force to the guerrillas.

== Aftermath ==
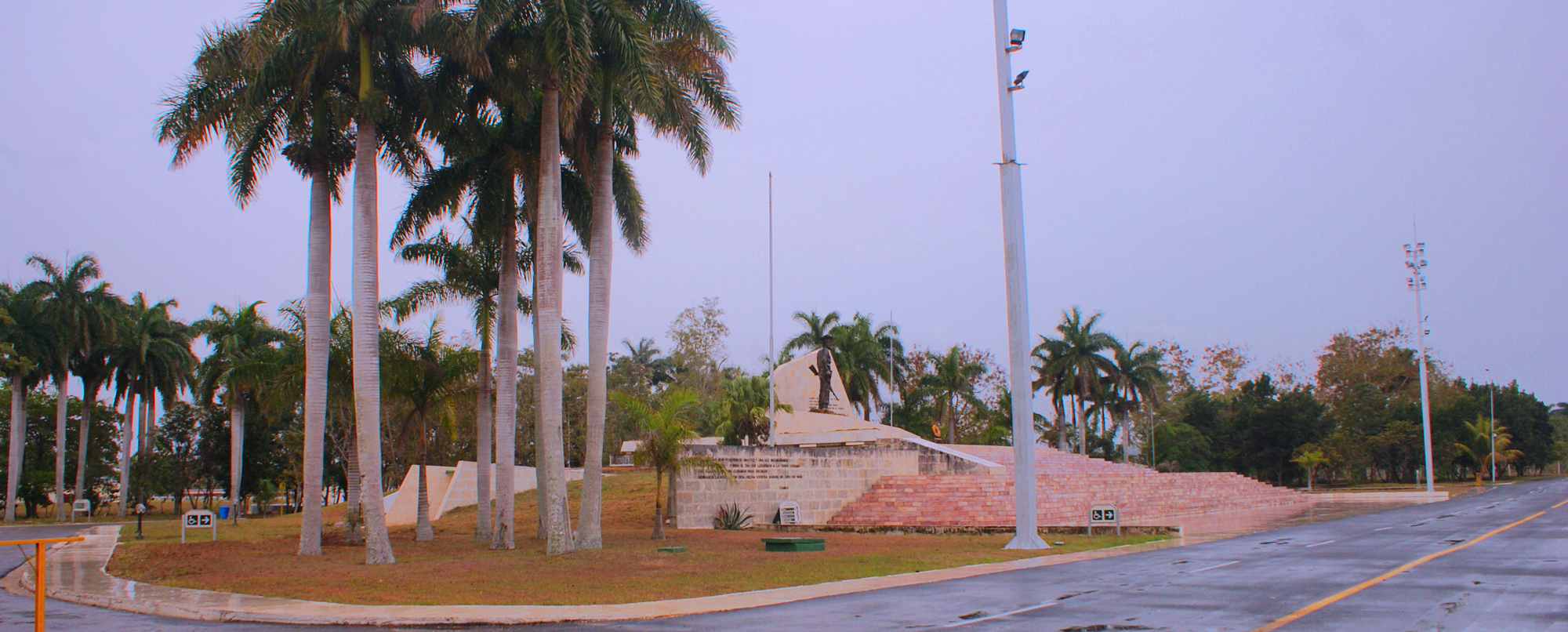
Central part of the battle's monument and plaza with the statue of Camilo Cienfuegos

The surrender of the garrison was a major blow to the defenders of the provincial capital of Santa Clara. The next day, the combined forces of Cienfuegos, Guevara, and local revolutionaries under William Alexander Morgan captured the city in a fight of vast confusion. Panicked by news of the defeat at Santa Clara and other losses, Batista fled Cuba the next day.

== See also ==
- Battle of La Plata
- Battle of Las Mercedes
