= Eulogio Cantillo =

Cuban Army major general (1911–1978)

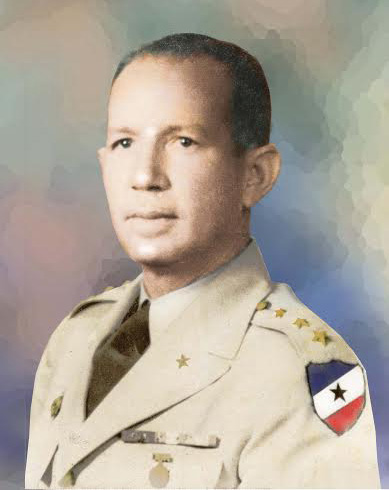
- Born: Eulogio Amado Cantillo Porras; 13 September 1911; Mantua, Pinar del Río Province, Republic of Cuba
- Died: 9 September 1978 (aged 66) Miami, Florida, United States
- Allegiance: Republic of Cuba
- Branch: Cuban Constitutional Army
- Conflicts: Cuban Revolution; Operation Verano; Battle of Las Mercedes

Eulogio Amado Cantillo Porras (13 September 1911 – 9 September 1978) was a major general in the Cuban Army. General Cantillo served as a senior Cuban Army officer during the dictatorship of Fulgencio Batista, but did not participate in the military coup that brought Batista to power. During the Cuban Revolution, he led Cuban soldiers in the fight against Fidel Castro's 26th of July Movement. After President Batista fled the country at 3:00 A.M. on January 1, 1959, he was left to serve briefly as the de facto Head of State in the early hours of January 1, 1959 until the official proclamation of the President of the Senate of Cuba, Anselmo Alliegro y Milá, as the Interim President of Cuba later that day. On January 2, 1959, the eldest judge of the Supreme Court, Carlos Manuel Piedra, was appointed as the Interim President by a junta led by him in accordance with the 1940 Cuban Constitution. However, the appointment of Piedra, the last president to be born under Spanish Cuba, was met with opposition from Castro, who believed that Manuel Urrutia should be appointed. After the Cuban Revolution, he was tried by the Revolutionary tribunals and sentenced to 15 years in prison. He was released early in the mid-1960s, and went into exile in Miami where he died on September 9, 1978.

== Biography ==
General Eulogio Cantillo was Chief of the Army Aviation Corps before he was appointed as Adjutant General of the Cuban Army. In the Cuban revolution, Cantillo led an offensive that unfolded in the summer of 1958 under the name Operation Verano, which had the goal of destroying the guerrillas of Fidel Castro that had been causing several army losses since the spring of 1957. At the time of the revolution, Cuba had a regular army of 24 battalions, and a total strength of 20,000 soldiers. For Operation Verano, Cantillo had 14 battalions with about 12,000 soldiers. Most of the soldiers were young recruits.

Cantillo surrounded the mountain range of the Sierra Maestra, and set up roadblocks to prevent supplies from getting to the guerrillas, and attacked from the north to drive the guerrillas down to the south coast. On the south coast he could make better use of air support, and artillery, than in the jungles of Sierra Maestra where guerrillas were impossible to hit. The offensive failed, largely because Cantillo's soldiers fought in unfamiliar terrain (forests and jungles of the Sierra Maestra) and because much of the army was demoralized and unmotivated. They were trained to fight against regular troops and not against 26 July Movement guerrillas that struck with tremendous firepower in one second, and disappeared into the jungle in the seconds after.

On August 8, 1958, Cantillo signed a secret armistice with the 26th of July movement, and thus the entire Verano offensive was over. Reasons to truce is unclear. Some argue that Cantillo sympathized with the guerrillas, while others claim that Cantillo still believed that Castro had over 2000 well-trained and well disciplined guerrillas. Therefore, he needed the truce to regroup his own forces so he could better counter the guerrillas. Fidel Castro however, used this time to create a counteroffensive, known as the Cauto campaign.

He was left as head of the Cuban Military and the De Facto Head of State of Cuba after Batista fled to the Dominican Republic in the early hours of January 1, 1959. He was later arrested by the revolutionary government, and put on trial. He was sentenced to 15 years in prison, but was released in 1967 before he served his full sentence, and left Cuba in 1968 to become a Cuban exile in Miami. While in Miami, he joined anti-Castro groups, and eventually died there on September 9, 1978.

== Bibliography ==
- Foss, Clive (2004), "Fidel Castro" .
- NW Damm & Son * Bonachea, Ramon and San Martin, Marta (1974), "The Cuban Insurrection: 1952-1959." Transaction Publishers, ISBN 0-87855-576-5 Transaction Publishers, ISBN 0-87855-576-5.
