= Camilo Cienfuegos =

Cuban revolutionary leader and guerrilla (1933–Missing 1959)

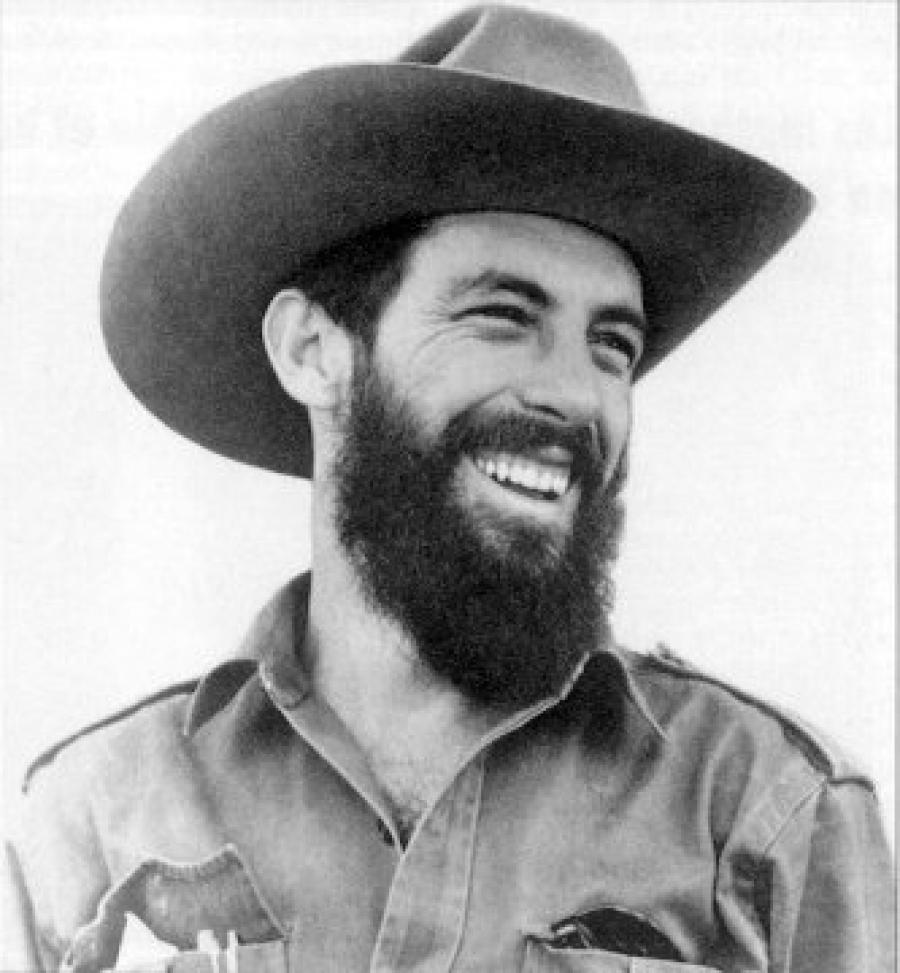
- Camilo Cienfuegos (c. 1959)

Commander-in-chief of the Revolutionary Armed Forces
- In office 3 January 1959 – 28 October 1959
- President: Manuel Urrutia
- Prime Minister: Fidel Castro

Personal details
- Born: Camilo Cienfuegos Gorriarán; 6 February 1932 Havana, La Habana, Cuba
- Died: 28 October 1959 (aged 27) Straits of Florida (presumed)
- Cause of death: Aviation accident (presumed)
- Resting place: North Atlantic Ocean (presumed)
- Party: 26th of July Movement
- Relatives: Osmany Cienfuegos (brother)
- Education: Academia Nacional de Bellas Artes San Alejandro

Military service
- Allegiance: Cuba
- Branch/service: Revolutionary Armed Forces
- Rank: Major
- Battles/wars: Cuban Revolution: Landing of the Granma; Operation Verano; Las Villas Operation; Battle of Yaguajay; Battle of Santa Clara

Camilo Cienfuegos Gorriarán (Note: In this Spanish name, the first or paternal surname is Cienfuegos and the second or maternal family name is Gorriarán.) (Spanish: [kaˈmilo sjeɱˈfweɣos ɣorjaˈɾan]; 6 February 1932 – 28 October 1959) was a Cuban revolutionary. One of the major figures of the Cuban Revolution, he was considered second only to Fidel Castro among the revolutionary leadership.

The son of Spanish anarchists, Cienfuegos engaged with left-wing politics from an early age, going on to join the opposition movement against the dictatorship of Fulgencio Batista. He joined Castro's 26th of July Movement on its expedition to Cuba and was one of the few survivors of the Landing of the Granma. He quickly distinguished himself as one of the top commanders of the Cuban Revolutionary Armed Forces and a popular leading figure of the revolution, becoming close friends with Che Guevara during their guerrilla campaign in Las Villas. After winning the Battle of Yaguajay in December 1958, Cienfuegos led the capture of Matanzas and Havana, where he was appointed commander-in-chief of the armed forces by the new revolutionary government. He oversaw the reorganization of the armed forces, in order to purge leading figures of the Cuban National Army and replace them with guerrilla commanders more loyal to Fidel Castro.

When army commander Huber Matos objected to Castro's consolidation of power, Castro ordered a reluctant Cienfuegos to arrest him. While flying back from Matos' former headquarters at Camagüey, Cienfuegos' plane disappeared over the Straits of Florida. After a few days of an attempted search and rescue operation, he was presumed dead by the Cuban government. His disappearance quickly spawned a number of conspiracy theories, many of which speculated Fidel or Raúl Castro to have been responsible, but no proof of such has been discovered. Cienfuegos has since become known as a revolutionary martyr in Cuba, with a number of institutions being dedicated to his name, including a Military Schools System and an Order of Merit.

Cienfuegos was a popular figure in Cuba, due to his cheerful and carefree personality, which contrasted sharply with the strict austerity of his comrade Guevara. Although he was claimed by different factions to have been a communist, an anti-communist, or an anarchist, he never publicly expressed any political ideology. The soldiers who fought for him remembered him for his friendly and paternal leadership style, while the Cuban government upheld him as a loyal supporter of Fidel Castro. Every year on 28 October, Cuban children throw flowers into the rivers and seas, in tribute to him.

== Early life ==
In 1932, Camilo Cienfuegos was born into a working-class family, the son of Spanish anarchists who had immigrated to Cuba. His father Ramón Cienfuegos worked as a tailor in Havana and was involved in left-wing political activism, working with Solidaridad Internacional Antifascista (SIA) and the Asociacíon Libertaria de Cuba (ALC). While Camilo was still an infant, his father took him along with him to raise money for the Republicans during the Spanish Civil War.

Camilo's older brother Osmany Cienfuegos, who had graduated as an architect, became a communist activist, at a time when student dissidents were highly active and increasingly being repressed by the anti-communist regime of Fulgencio Batista. Having himself enrolled in an art school to study sculpture, in December 1955, Camilo participated in a series of student demonstrations that were violently broken up by the authorities. After laying a wreath at a monument to Antonio Maceo, while walking back to their university, he and his fellow students were shot and wounded by police. He was eventually forced to drop out of school due to financial difficulties and began working at the same clothing shop as his father. He also briefly emigrated to the United States, where he worked illegally for a period. In 1956, Cienfuegos moved to Mexico and joined Fidel Castro's 26th of July Movement for its expedition back to Cuba.

== Guerrilla activities ==
=== Landing and first offensive ===
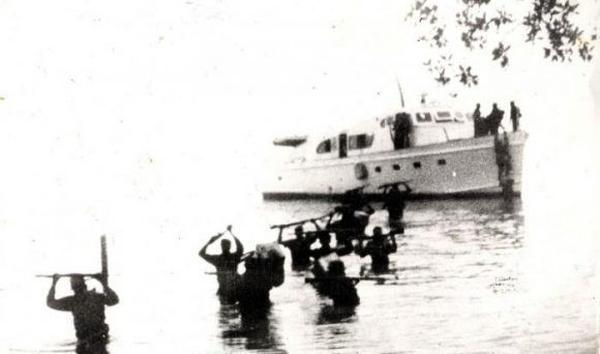
Cuban guerrillas disembarking after the Landing of the Granma

After the landing of the Granma on 2 December 1956, 26 July Movement made its way into the Sierra Maestra, where they were ambushed in a cane field by the Cuban National Army on 5 December. Many of the guerrillas were captured and killed, forcing the rest to escape into the mountains. Cienfuegos' small group wandered around the area for days, eventually being pointed in Castro's direction by local peasants. He found himself to be one of only twelve men who had survived the initial expedition.

During the setup for an ambush of the National Army, Cienfuegos accidentally almost shot Che Guevara, who was disguised as a National Army officer. Despite this mistake, the ambush went ahead successfully. The ranks of the rebels soon grew, as they gained the support of the local peasantry. Relations with new recruits did not start off well, as the veterans were frustrated by their lack of experience, knowledge, and proper equipment. This larger revolutionary armed force was divided into three companies, while Cienfuegos took command of a small special vanguard unit. It was also brought under the command of an inner council, of which Cienfuegos was also a member. With Fidel Castro as commander-in-chief, all of the leading commanders of the revolutionary armed forces shared equal rank: that of major.

In March 1957, the National Army initiated a counter-offensive against the rebels, confidently declaring victory over them by early April. Within weeks, the rebels returned to Pico Turquino, supported by the local population. There they made efforts to combat the chronic malnutrition and illness of the peasantry, carried out agrarian reform, and taught classes on Marxist theory. By May 1957, the rebels were marching east, planning to launch another attack against the army. With Castro having appointed Cienfuegos as commander of the Second Column, on 28 May, the rebels surrounded the Uvero barracks and began firing on it. Despite some losses, the rebels were victorious and quickly looted the barracks, taking supplies and prisoners of war back into the mountains with them.

=== In Guevara's Column ===
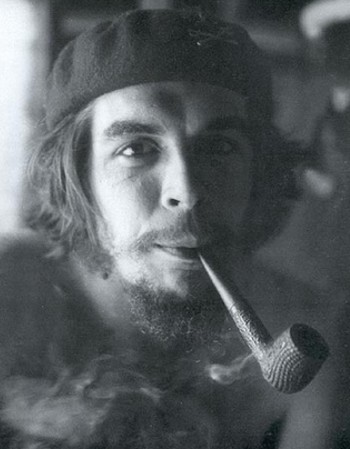
Che Guevara, during his guerrilla campaign

With the rebellion well under way, both the National and Revolutionary armies were now attempting to assert their rule over the Sierra Maestra. In the absence of firm state control, the region fell into chaos, as various armed groups committed a litany of abuses. The rebels themselves had a code of conduct and Che Guevara in particular was committed to strict discipline, which caused tensions with the recruits when rebel commander Lalo Sardiñas shot a disobedient soldier. Castro defended the killing as a disciplinary action, managing to persuade a majority of the soldiers to vote for his demotion. Many of those in the minority that had wanted to see him executed subsequently left the rebel forces.

Sardiñas was stripped of command and replaced by Cienfuegos, who was made captain of Guevara's vanguard platoon. Cienfuegos' and Guevara's leadership styles proved complementary, as "Camilo's devil-may-care personality helped offset Che's strictness", and the two became fast friends. Castro ordered Cienfuegos to pursue and neutralise a group of "bandits", who they wanted to try for abuses being committed under the revolutionary banner. The column went to Mount Caracas, where they captured the Chinese Cuban bandit leader Chino Chang, tried him by revolutionary tribunal and executed him. Three of Chang's young followers were subjected to a mock execution, after which they were invited to join the revolutionary army. They also captured and executed some young bandits who had stolen from the revolutionaries, as well as a rapist who had impersonated Guevara. When interviewed about the executions, Castro downplayed the number and justified the documented cases. In October 1957, Guevara pulled back and began looking to establish industrial infrastructure in the region, so that the guerrilla war could be materially sustained. Before long, the revolutionaries had managed to establish an entire insurgent economy in El Hombrito, complete with a dam, a hospital, farms, factories, and workshops.

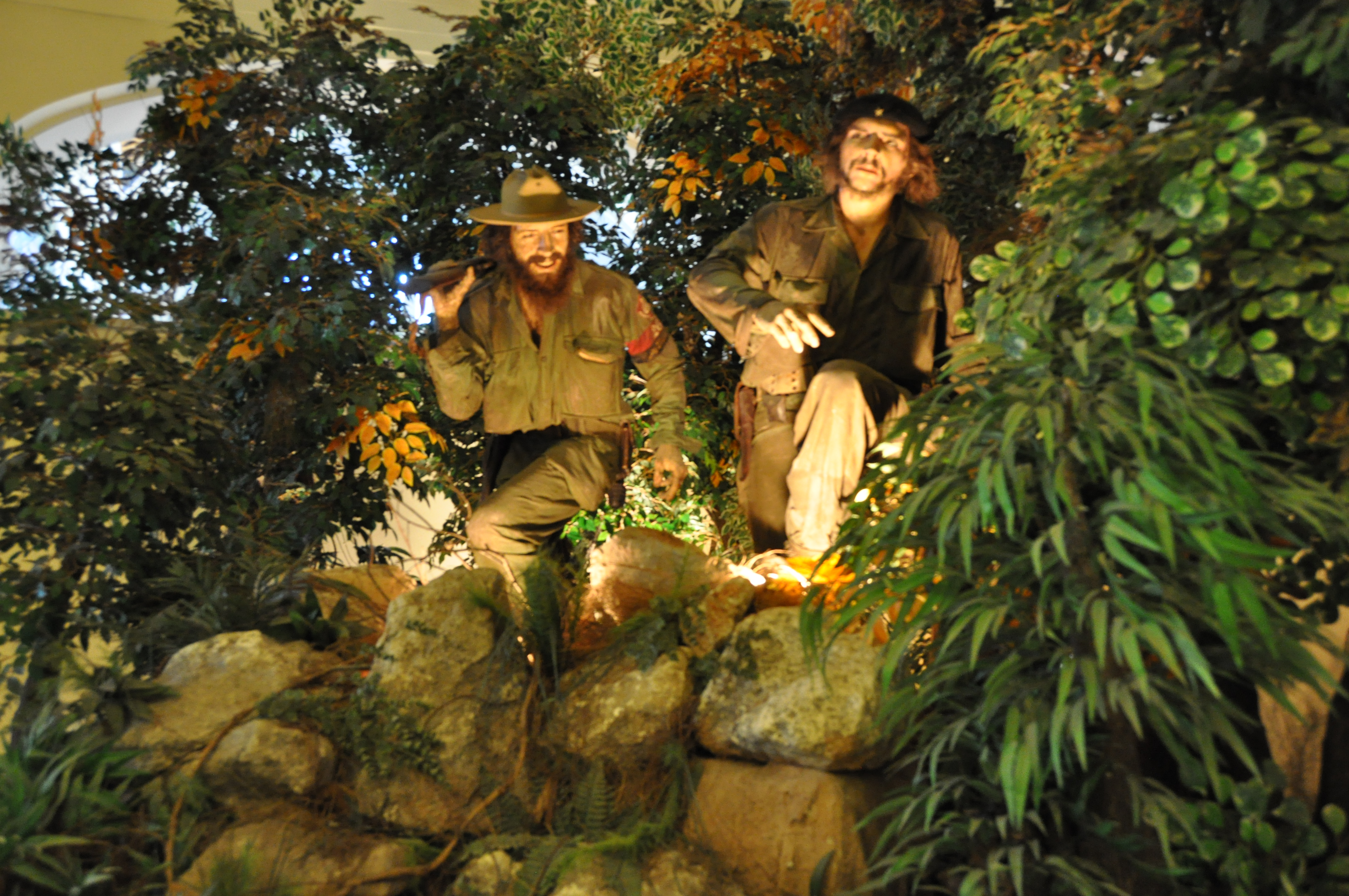
Exhibit at the Museum of the Revolution, depicting Cienfuegos (left) and Guevara (right) laying an ambush in the Sierra

The following month, they received news that Ángel Sánchez Mosquera was leading the National Army through the adjacent valley and destroying the local peasantry's homes there. Cienfuegos was dispatched to ambush them from behind, but the engagement was quick and only resulted in one National soldier's death before both sides withdrew. Cienfuegos then attempted a second attack, taking up position near the National Army camp while waiting for reinforcements from Guevara's column. On 29 November, the rebels set their ambush, covering all routes of escape and concealing themselves in the trees. Most of the National Army soldiers were gunned down in the farmhouse they were stationed in, while guerrilla patrols attempted to hold back reinforcements from arriving. After a bloody day of fighting, the rebels were forced to retreat, having lost a number of men. They were pursued along the way by Sánchez Mosquera's forces, as their defensive lines collapsed.

Again, they attempted to set up an ambush. Cienfuegos was to fire the starting shot at point-blank range from behind a tree, following which partially-concealed sharpshooters would open fire on the road. During the subsequent fire fight, Guevara was hit in the foot, lost his rifle, and was again forced to pull back. Guevara went to request urgent reinforcements from Castro, but found that the National Army had withdrawn from the area. He was initially pleased and, after his foot was operated on, returned to his base camp in El Hombrito, which he found completely destroyed. As the new year of 1958 dawned, Guevara's column began establishing a new base camp in La Mesa.

In February 1958, Guevara's armory began preparing supplies for the rebel forces' first offensive of the year, a planned attack on a National Army company at Pino del Agua. On 16 February, the rebels attacked the army camp with explosives, overrunning the guard posts. After initial rebel successes, National reinforcements arrived and Cienfuegos was shot twice, while attempting to retrieve a machine gun. At Guevara's command, the rebels attempted to rout the National Army, but ultimately decided to pull back as they did not have support from the wounded Cienfuegos. The rebels retreated into the hills again, where they carried out a series of sabotage attacks against the army.

=== Independent command ===
With rebel activity increasing around the country, Castro moved to extend their theatre of operations. On 27 February, he appointed Cienfuegos, Juan Almeida and Raúl Castro to command their own columns. While Raúl and Almeida were dispatched to carry out guerrilla activities in Oriente, Cienfuegos was left to recover from his wounds. Meanwhile, Castro himself began consolidating his authority within the "free territory" that had been carved out of the Sierra Maestra.

In March 1958, the Catholic Church in Cuba began calling for peace negotiations and the formation of a national unity government, but the initiative was rejected by Castro. As Fulgencio Batista attempted to salvage the situation, the 26 July Movement and the Revolutionary Directorate signed a joint manifesto on 12 March, which called for a general strike and "total war" against the Batista regime. However, the call for a general strike was disregarded by the trade unions, as many workplaces remained open and any workers taking strike action were shot by Batista's death squads. The failure of the general strike was a blow to the revolutionaries, with different factions blaming each other, while Batista received new arms shipments from Dominican dictator Rafael Trujillo. In response, 26 July Movement and the Popular Socialist Party formed an alliance against the regime, with many communists joining the army.

On 16 April, Cienfuegos returned to active combat in the Sierra, with Castro appointing him as commander of the guerrilla warfare in the area between Bayamo, Manzanillo, and Las Tunas. There he was directed to sabotage the National Army, take over supply lines, and implement agrarian reform and a new civil code. Castro aimed to defend Sierra Maestra, as it became clear that Batista was planning a new offensive. Castro and Guevara subsequently moved their headquarters into the hills, where they clashed with Sánchez Mosquera's forces. After Guevara had set up camp, Castro tasked him with establishing and running a military school in order to train new recruits. He had hoped to reunite on the front lines with Cienfuegos, who consoled his friend with a letter:

Che. Soul brother: I see Fidel has put you in charge of the Military School, which makes me very happy because now we can count on having first-class soldiers in the future... You've played a very principal role in this showdown and if we need you in this insurrectional stage, Cuba needs you even more when the war ends, so the Giant [Fidel] does a good thing in looking after you. I would like to be always at your side, you were my chief for a long time and you will always continue to be. Thanks to you I now have the opportunity to be more useful, I'll do the unspeakable to not make you look bad. Your eternal chicharrón, Camilo.

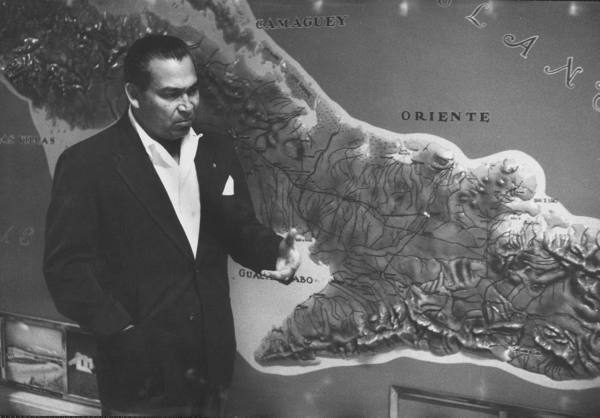
Fulgencio Batista planning Operation Verano

On 24 May 1958, the National Army launched Operation Verano, an offensive into the Sierra that aimed to cut off Castro's supply lines and weaken his forces. When the National Army advanced in the foothills along the northern front, Castro was forced to withdraw all of his forces from the south, as he only had 300 soldiers for the defense. On 26 June, Cienfuegos' patrol group was recalled from Holguín, in order to reinforce the revolutionary forces against the national offensive. The revolutionaries were then able to continuously ambush the army, which mostly focused on guarding coffee and sugar plantations, while their own insurgent economy only grew.

=== Las Villas Operation ===
By August 1958, the National Army had finally withdrawn from the Sierra and Castro began to plan new offensive operations. By this time, independent insurrections had broken out in the Escambray Mountains of Central Cuba. Castro decided to send Che Guevara and Cienfuegos west, in an attempt to bring the direction of the fighting under their command. Cienfuegos himself was directed to lead his 82-strong Antonio Maceo Column across the island towards Pinar del Río, in emulation of his column's namesake.

Together with Guevara's own column, they left the revolutionary headquarters on foot, as their vehicles had been rendered useless by a National Army ambush. The two columns travelled together for a while, wading through rice paddies and swamps, while attempting to evade the National Army and any aerial bombardment. They advanced into Camagüey on 7 September and clashed with the National Army at Santa Cruz del Sur. The revolutionaries pressed on despite the poor conditions of the expedition, with Cienfuegos reporting in October:

Forty days of march, often with the south coast and a compass as the only guide. During fifteen days we marched with water and mud up to the knees, travelling by night to avoid ambushes... during the thirty-one days of our journey across Camagüey we ate eleven times. After four days of famine we had to eat a mare... Almost all our animals were left in the marsh.

During the "Westward March of Che and Camilo", the revolutionaries took control of a number of towns, cities, and transportation hubs. Further clashes occurred during the expedition and sometimes it was necessary to stop and dispense justice, with Cienfuegos being noted to have shot two of his men for looting. In Camagüey, they received assistance from local communists, who helped produce propaganda leaflets for 26 July Movement.

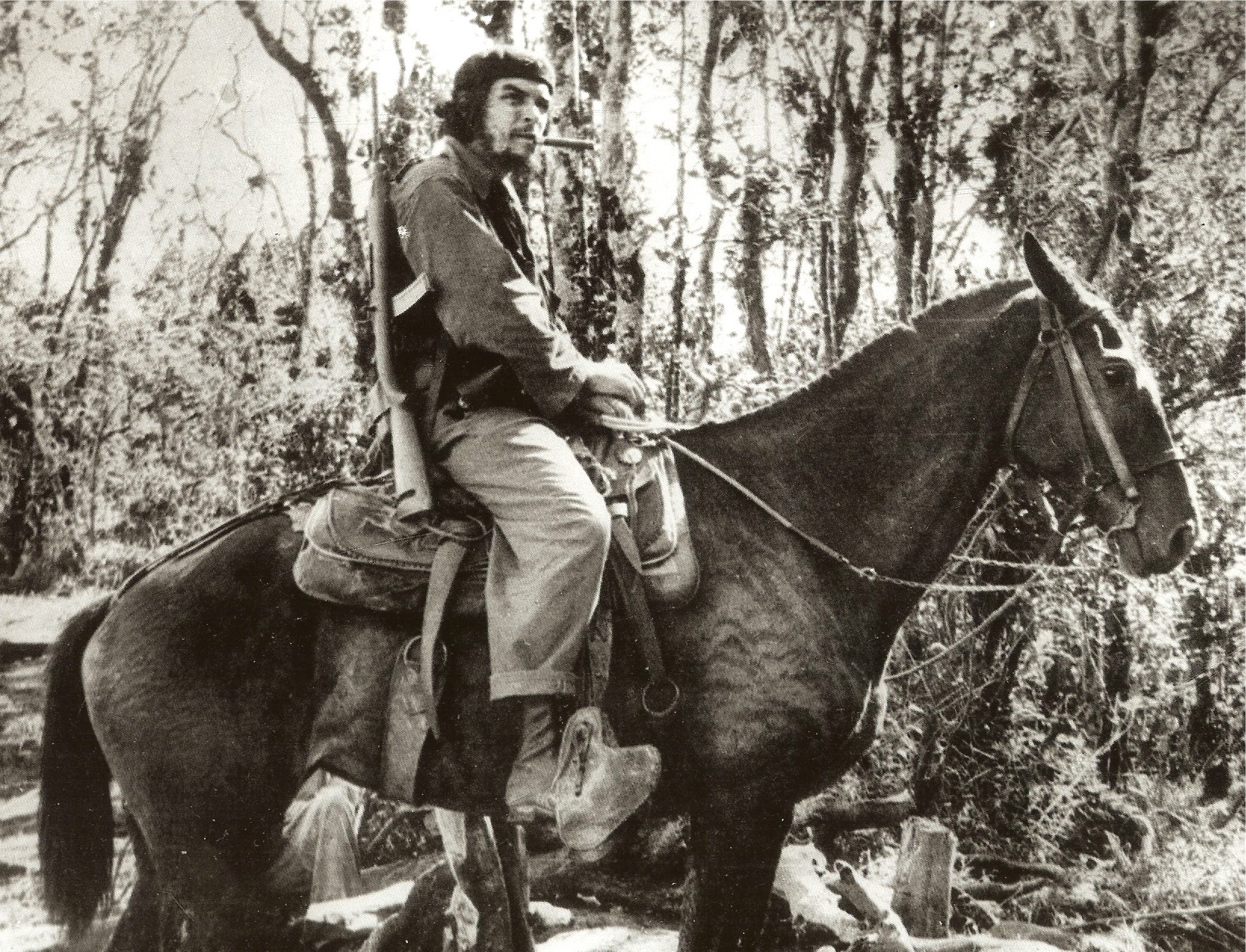
Che Guevara on a mule in Las Villas (1958)

Before the arrival of Guevara and Cienfuegos in Las Villas, the insurrection there was mostly directed by independent groups such as the Revolutionary Directorate and the Second National Front of Escambray, as well as small detachments of the Popular Socialist Party and 26 July Movement. Although these groups had accomplished little before, the new leadership of Guevara and Cienfuegos would transform the revolutionary situation in Las Villas and prove instrumental to the adhesion of the Communists to the movement. Cienfuegos' and Guevara's columns arrived in Las Villas on 14 October 1958, gaining strength from National Army deserters and local 26 July Movement activists along the way. There Cienfuegos' column was joined by another commanded by the Communist Félix Torres, who subordinated himself to Cienfuegos' command. Together they clashed with a 450-strong detachment of the National Army and faced difficulties with a local unit of the Revolutionary Directorate, with Enrique Oltuski coming to them from Trinidad, in Sancti Spíritus Province, to mediate the dispute, and in the process meeting Guevara and Cienfuegos.

Cienfuegos' column was supplied with provisions by the local communist militants such as Armando Acosta, who became Guevara's personal aide. Cienfuegos spent much of his time there organising regular collective reading sessions, dedicated to studying the works of Cuban national heroes José Martí and Antonio Maceo, the latter of whom Cienfuegos read aloud himself "in a deep voice". The revolutionaries also implemented a programme of agrarian reform in Las Villas, with Cienfuegos organising local sugar workers to hold a national conference later in the year. As Guevara attempted to form an alliance with the Directorate, Cienfuegos apparently displayed "no eagerness" to move on to his destination of Pinar del Río.

When the 1958 Cuban general election was held, Guevara and Cienfuegos organised a boycott in Las Villas and attempted to prevent voting urns from being brought to the province. Cienfuegos was ordered to attack towns in the north of the province, which succeeded in bringing provincial traffic to a standstill on the day of the election. In an attempt to appeal for US support, president-elect Andrés Rivero Agüero initially promised to negotiate a peaceful solution to the political crisis in the country, but quickly re-committed to Batista's plan of forcefully suppressing the uprising.

In November 1958, the National Air Force began bombarding Guevara's forces daily and the National Army moved several heavily armed companies towards their positions. Cienfuegos brought his Column to reinforce Guevara and the two sides battled for a week. On 4 December 1958, the National Army's offensive was halted and they were then pushed back to Fomento, with the revolutionaries capturing a large amount of territory and materiel. As Cienfuegos and Guevara continued to see success against the National Army, Cienfuegos' column was ordered to remain in the province, rather than pushing on to Pinar del Río.

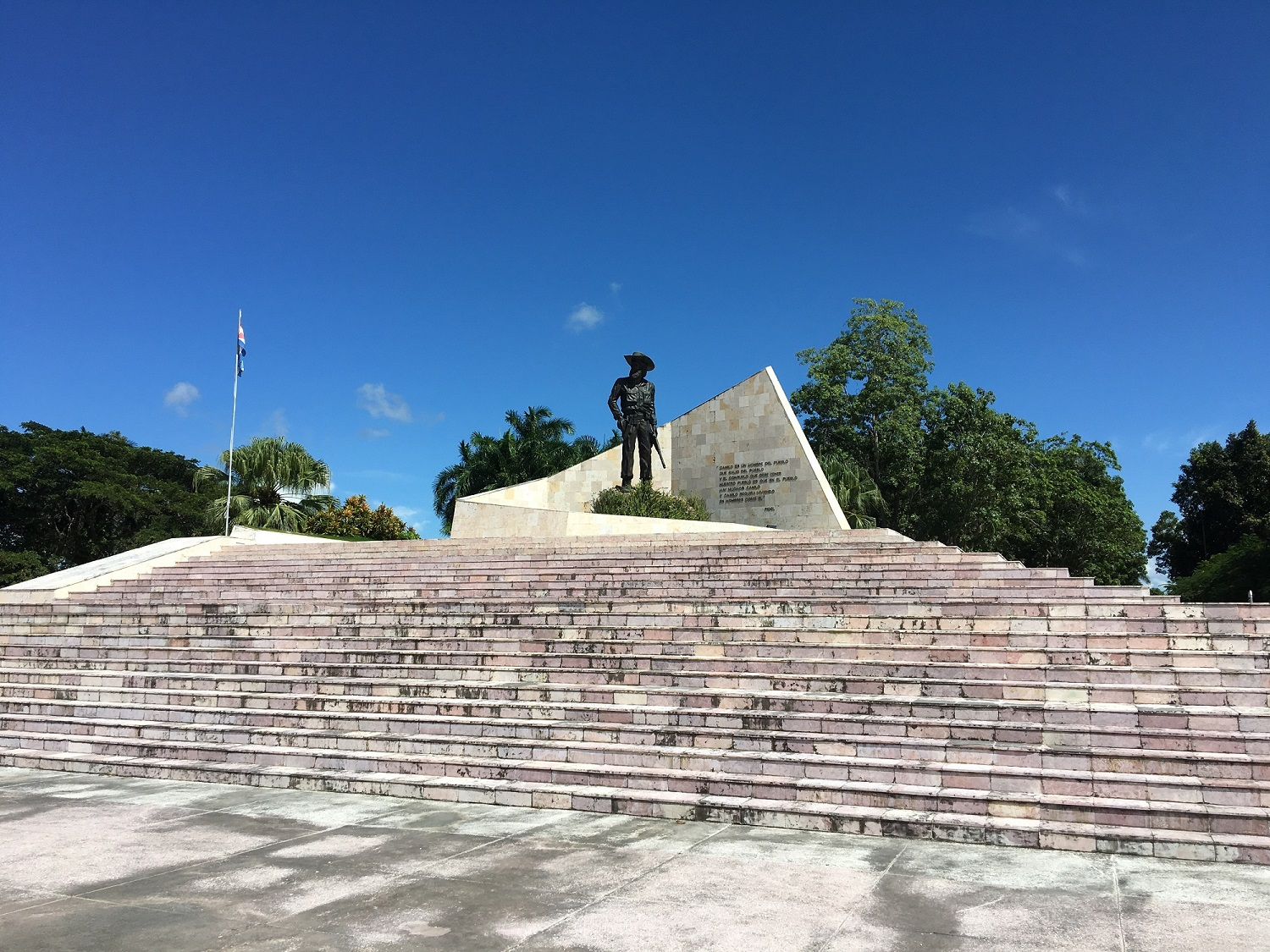
Monument to Cienfuegos in Yaguajay

Instead, Cienfuegos and Guevara aimed to cut the island in half by definitively capturing the province. Guevara captured Fomento on 18 December, and Cabaiguán and Guayos on 21 December, before moving on to capture the junction at Placetas. By Christmas Day, they had captured most of the province, leaving only the major cities in the hands of the regime. Meanwhile, Cienfuegos' column moved to the north of the province and launched an attack on the National Army garrison at Yaguajay. During the ensuing Battle of Yaguajay, Cienfuegos' column captured 250 men and 375 rifles, before moving on.

This offensive proved to be the coup de grâce of the Batista regime, with the President himself deciding to flee the country. By the end of December 1958, Las Villas was completely under revolutionary control, cutting communications between the National Army in the east and the west. Guevara then began making preparations for their final campaign. Guevara and Cienfuegos received orders from Castro, directing them to advance on Havana, while specifying that it "be carried out exclusively by the 26th of July forces. Camilo's column should be in the lead, the vanguard, to take over Havana when the dictatorship falls, if we don't want the weapons from Camp Columbia [military headquarters] to be distributed among all the various groups, which would present a very serious problem in the future."

=== Revolutionary victory ===
On 2 January 1959, Cienfuegos' and Guevara's columns finally moved on the Cuban capital of Havana, with Guevara capturing the fortress of La Cabaña. That day, Cienfuegos' column arrived at Matanzas, where they accepted the unconditional surrender of the local regiment. The soldiers were disarmed of their rifles but allowed by Cienfuegos to keep their pistols. Cienfuegos' column then moved on and occupied Camp Columbia in Havana, which Cienfuegos received command over from Ramón Barquín. When Carlos Franqui arrived in Havana, he reported of Cienfuegos' Camp Columbia that:

The gloomy Camp Columbia, mother of the tyranny and of crime, which I had known as a prisoner, was now almost a picturesque theater, impossible to imagine. On the one hand, the bearded rebels with Camilo, no more than five hundred of them, and on the other hand, twenty thousand army soldiers intact — generals, colonels, majors, captains, corporals, sergeants, and privates. When they saw us walk by, they stood at attention. It was enough to make you burst out laughing. In the comandant's office was Camilo, with his romantic beard, looking like Christ on a spree, his boots thrown on the floor and his feet up on the table, as he received his excellency the ambassador of the United States.

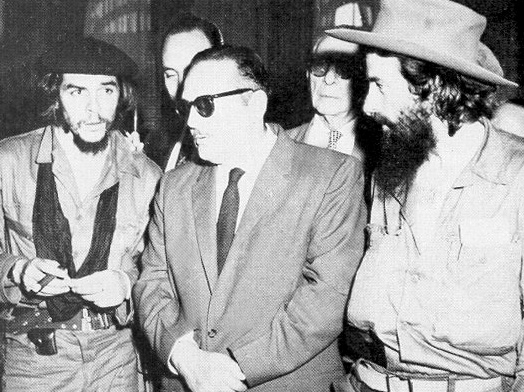
President of Cuba Manuel Urrutia with Che Guevara and Camilo Cienfuegos in Havana (1959)

The following day, 26 July Movement called for a general strike to mark the final blow to the Batista regime, with the old institutions falling to the revolution with each passing hour. As Batista's former soldiers defected en masse to the revolution, the newly installed revolutionary president Manuel Urrutia appointed Cienfuegos as commander-in-chief of the Revolutionary Armed Forces. On 5 January, Cienfuegos welcomed members of the new revolutionary Council of Ministers as they arrived in Havana, where they awaited Castro.

While Castro delayed in reaching the capital, Cienfuegos became the public face of the revolution in Havana. When visited in Camp Columbia by television reporters, who broadcast the interaction to thousands of viewers, he made a point to release a number of parrots from their birdcages, declaring "these also have a right to liberty". Cienfuegos' "easy manners" quickly became emblematic of the revolutionaries, who Havana was pleasantly surprised to find on good behavior; neither drinking alcohol nor looting the city after its capture. Due to the saturation of radio and television access in Cuba, before long, "everyone knew who Camilo Cienfuegos was" and could easily identify the rebel commander. Castro himself preferred Cienfuegos taking the center stage over the foreign communist Guevara, as the "handsome, Stetson-wearing, baseball-playing, womanizing, humorous Camilo was Cuban, not known to be a Communist, and had already become a popular folk hero."

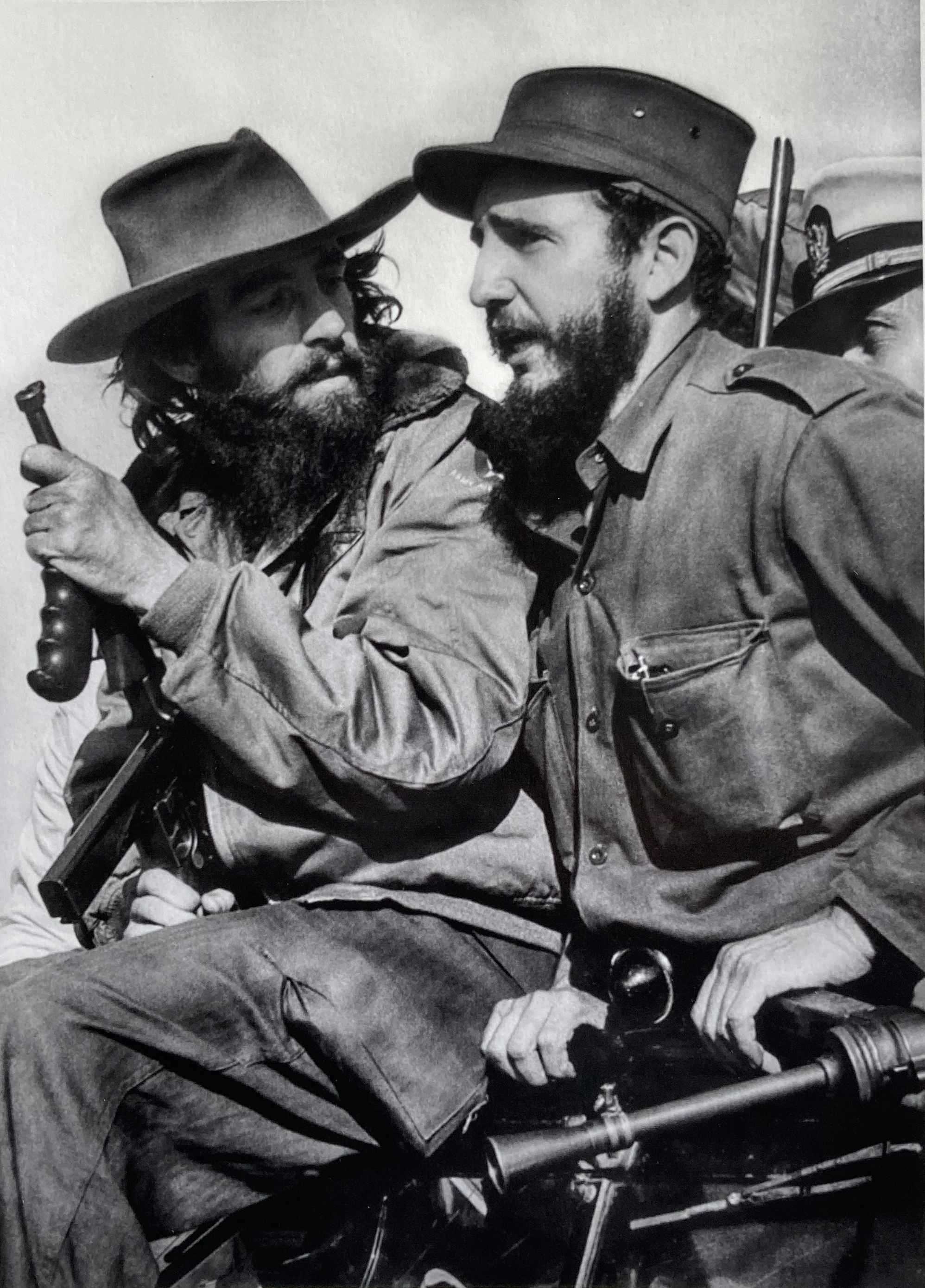
Cienfuegos watching Castro speak at Camp Columbia

Tensions had not yet subsided, as the Revolutionary Directorate held on to the Presidential Palace and refused to vacate it for the arrival of the new president, with Cienfuegos considering an attack against the palace. According to Franqui: "Camilo, half joking and half serious, said a couple of cannonballs should be fired off as a warning. [...] As I was not an admirer of the palace, I said it seemed like a good idea, but Che, with his sense of responsibility, told us it wasn't the right time to waste cannonballs, and he patiently returned to the palace, met Faure Chomón, and matters were straightened out. Camilo always listened to Che." The situation was thus diffused and the palace was peacefully handed over to Urrutia. On 8 January, Fidel Castro finally arrived in Havana, meeting with Urrutia at the presidential palace and giving a speech at Cienfuegos' Camp Columbia. During the rally, Castro interrupted his speech to ask Cienfuegos "¿Voy bien, Camilo?" (English: "Am I doing all right, Camilo?") Cienfuegos responded in kind, "Vas bien, Fidel!" (English: "You are doing fine, Fidel!")

== After the Revolution ==
=== Initial activities ===
In the wake of the revolution, most political parties dissolved themselves voluntarily, hoping to make way for a "new political order". By 10 January 1959, Cienfuegos had legalized the Popular Socialist Party (PSP), declaring that it "would have rights to organize themselves like all other democratic parties providing that they did not represent the interests of a foreign power". Che supported Cienfuegos' decision, himself considering the PSP to have proven themselves worthy of participating in the government and aiding them in their early operations. Meanwhile, Camilo solicited his brother Osmany Cienfuegos, a member of the PSP, to establish a Cultural Section of the Revolutionary Armed Forces that would oversee the Cuban literacy campaign. According to Julio García Espinosa, Cienfuegos also commissioned a number of PSP members as officers in the army, even though they had not fought in the war. Cienfuegos also participated in talks between 26 July Movement and the Popular Socialist Party, which aimed at merging the two organisations.

Having declared victory for the Revolution, Cienfuegos never ended up taking an official position within the government. He instead preferred to enjoy Havana's nightlife, going to clubs and reveling in his status as "the spoiled darling of the masses". In February 1959, Cienfuegos surprised Guevara by arranging a free flight for Guevara's family to come see him from Argentina. If Guevara had known about it, he may not have allowed it, due to his self-imposed austerity. When Guevara married Aleida March on 2 June, Cienfuegos arrived with bottles of rum "to liven up" the wedding reception. Shortly after the wedding, Guevara went to Egypt to meet with state representatives of the Bandung Pact. While away, Guevara's men began to worry that he had been removed by Castro, protesting to Cienfuegos when an unpopular commander was named as his substitute. But Cienfuegos proved unmoved by their complaints and reprimanded the soldiers for not obeying orders.

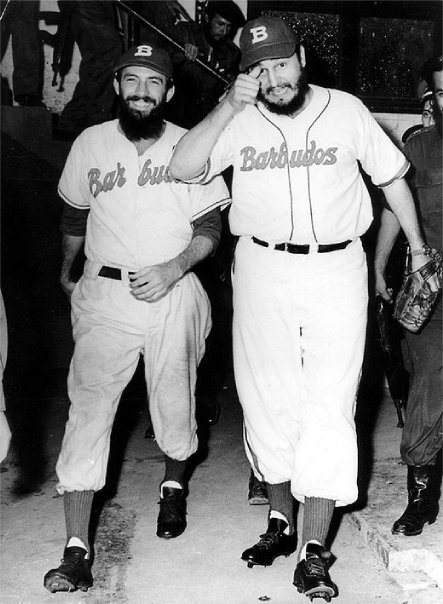
Cienfuegos (left) and Fidel Castro (right), arriving to play baseball in Havana

On the anniversary of the attack on the Moncada Barracks that had started the Revolution, the revolutionary government went to mass, where they commemorated those that fell during the revolution, before presiding over a mass demonstration at Plaza de la Revolución, followed by a military parade. Later that night, they held a baseball game at the Estadio Latinoamericano, where Cienfuegos and Castro played for a team called "Los Barbudos" (lit. 'the Bearded Ones'). Baseball quickly became a fixture of post-revolutionary Cuban culture, with United States ambassador Philip Bonsal observing: "The spectacle of the Prime Minister, alleged by his admirers to have been a promising pitcher of big league caliber, throwing a few curves to Major Camilo Cienfuegos, a former minor-leaguer, and generally clowning about on the diamond was a feature of the pregame show of many important contests."

=== Consolidation of the Revolution ===
Before long, Cienfuegos was observing the beginnings of Castro's consolidation of power. Castro quickly tasked Cienfuegos, Ramiro Valdés, and Victor Pina with establishing a new Intelligence Directorate, which Valdés took charge of. Castro also began reorganizing the armed forces, purging the officers of the old National Army and replacing them with a new military elite of ex-guerrillas that were personally loyal to Castro.

Although Cienfuegos originally envisioned an equitable merger of the Revolutionary and National Armies, Castro quickly convinced him that it was "necessary to reorganize the armed forces with men loyal to the Revolution, and not accomplices of tyranny." In the process, Cienfuegos was appointed chief of staff of the Revolutionary Armed Forces, replacing Colonel José Rego Rubido. In September 1959, Cienfuegos joined the Castro brothers in going to Santa Clara, where they sacked the provincial heads of 26 July Movement, the revolutionary army, and Instituto Nacional de Reforma Agraria (INRA), replacing them with more loyal supporters of Castro.

During this time, Castro also dispatched a group of 200 Dominicans and 10 Cuban guerrillas to invade the Dominican Republic and oust Rafael Trujillo. Almost all of them were captured, tortured, and killed. Before it was carried out, Sacha Volman had begged Cienfuegos to call off the expedition, fearing it to be doomed. Cienfuegos agreed and attempted to convince Castro to call it off, but he pushed forward with the plan. Volman later claimed that the expedition was "set up to fail".

The conflict between Castro and the liberal president Manuel Urrutia, in which the former rallied his supporters to oust the latter, lay the foundations for the construction of an authoritarian state, with Castro dissolving all remaining institutions of civilian government. Cienfuegos complained during the events that "[t]his Fidel really likes to fuck around".

=== Huber Matos affair ===
Castro's consolidation of power, as well as the increasing role of the Popular Socialist Party in government, began to worry some officers in the Revolutionary Army. The provincial commander of Camagüey, Huber Matos, shared his own concerns with Cienfuegos, who promised to investigate the situation.

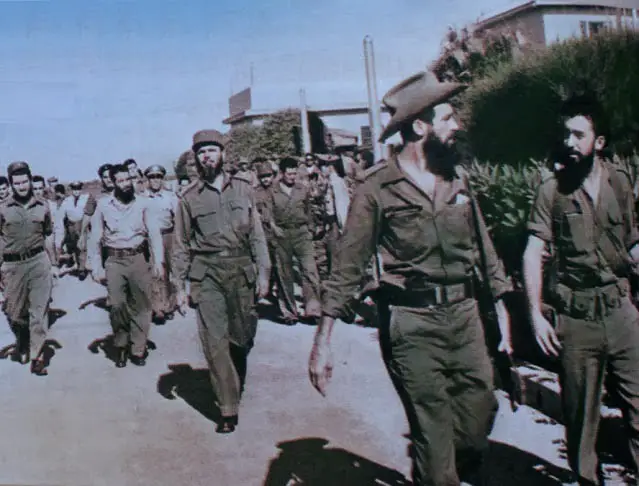
Cienfuegos arresting Huber Matos

In October 1959, Raúl Castro was promoted to Minister of the Revolutionary Armed Forces, formally demoting Cienfuegos, who had previously been his superior officer. This triggered the resignation of Huber Matos, who accused Fidel Castro of "burying the revolution". Fidel responded by publicly denouncing Matos for treason. Cienfuegos, along with Guevara and President Osvaldo Dorticós, considered Castro's denunciations of Matos to have been a mistake and attempted to persuade Fidel to be lenient while prosecuting him. When Raúl Castro ordered Cienfuegos to arrest Matos, he initially refused, only reluctantly accepting the order when Fidel gave it personally.

Fidel dispatched Cienfuegos to Camagüey, where he found that Matos' forces remained loyal to their commander. Matos ordered his officers to treat Cienfuegos' arrival with respect, so as to make it clear that there was no conspiracy against the government, but they instead resigned en masse. Cienfuegos arrested Matos and his fellow dissidents without resistance, refusing to handcuff his former comrade and walking side-by-side with him in front of the press. Matos was then taken back to Havana. Cienfuegos remained behind in Camagüey to take over Matos' command, overseeing the complete reorganization of the province's armed forces.

=== Disappearance ===
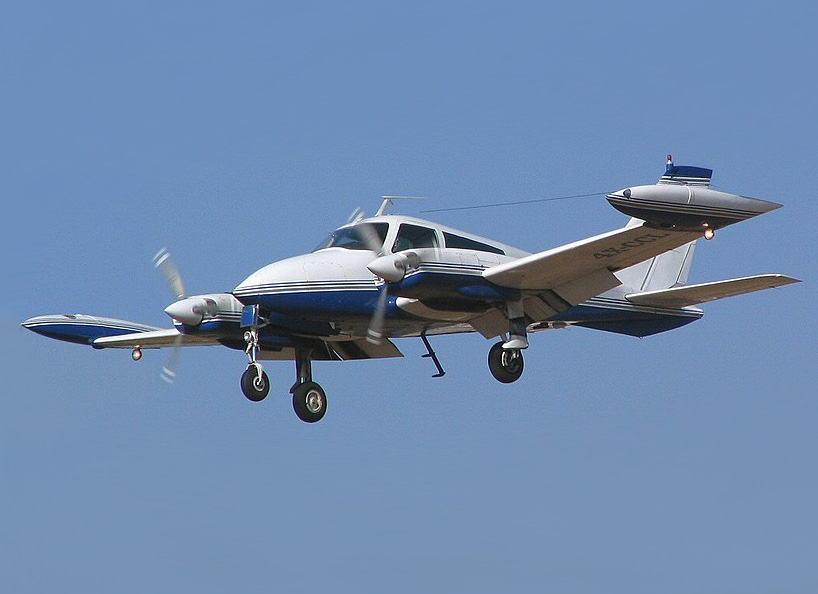
A Cessna 310, the model of plane that Cienfuegos was on when he disappeared

On the evening of 28 October 1959, Cienfuegos' Cessna 310 took off from Camagüey, headed for Havana. Cienfuegos disappeared along the way, his plane apparently having been lost in the Caribbean Sea.

News of his disappearance was not reported until 30 October. When news of it was brought to the Cabinet by Raúl Castro, Fidel seemed surprised and visibly upset, and the government quickly ordered a search and rescue operation. Throughout the country, Catholics held mass processions in honour of Cienfuegos and the political leadership widely publicised their concern for their lost comrade. The military followed any leads they could, speaking with peasants that claimed to have witnessed a plane crash and even consulting a spiritualist. According to United States ambassador Philip Bonsal, he had provided a number of American planes to cooperate in the search efforts, but the Cuban government assigned them to a location where it was unlikely the plane could have been. Castro never mentioned American assistance in his report of the search efforts.

For publicity, Castro was filmed searching for Cienfuegos with his parents, who posed for pictures searching the skies for their lost son. But some of those who accompanied Castro on these search flights claimed that he never appeared to be emotionally invested in the search and seemed indifferent to Cienfuegos' fate. While himself investigating the disappearance, Cienfuegos' former aide Major Cristóbal Naranjo was murdered by Captain Manuel Beatón, apparently during a drunken argument after Beatón was passed over for a promotion. After escaping into the Sierra Maestra and becoming a bandit, Beatón was himself assassinated the following year, prompting many to suspect foul play in the disappearance of Cienfuegos.

Cienfuegos was falsely reported to have been found on 5 November, and work stopped throughout the country as people came out into the streets to celebrate. Ruby Hart Phillips reported that "merchants were forced to close their stores because the clerks deserted. I was surprised to learn that Major Cienfuegos was so popular." Many Catholics credited Our Lady of Charity or Jude the Apostle for the miracle.

But in reality, no sign of a plane wreckage had actually been found. Hours after the report of Cienfuegos' discovery, the Revolutionary Armed Forces denied its validity, alleging it to have been counter-revolutionary propaganda that had aimed to assassinate Castro. In mid-November, the search for Cienfuegos was called off. The Cuban government subsequently declared Camilo Cienfuegos to be presumed dead. His body has never been discovered and the official story has neither been proven nor disproven.

While Matos was given a show trial by a revolutionary tribunal, Cienfuegos was made into a revolutionary martyr. Fidel Castro accelerated his consolidation of power after Cienfuegos' death, using it as a reason to convince Cubans of the need to "defend the Revolution at all costs". This meant the end of judicial independence and the re-establishment of revolutionary tribunals, which expanded the definition of "counter-revolutionary" by criminalising strike action, eliminating the category of "political prisoner" and assuming collective guilt by association. After the Prensa Libre reported on allegations of rising tensions between them and Cienfuegos, the Castros also began to campaign against freedom of the press.

== Character ==
=== Personality ===
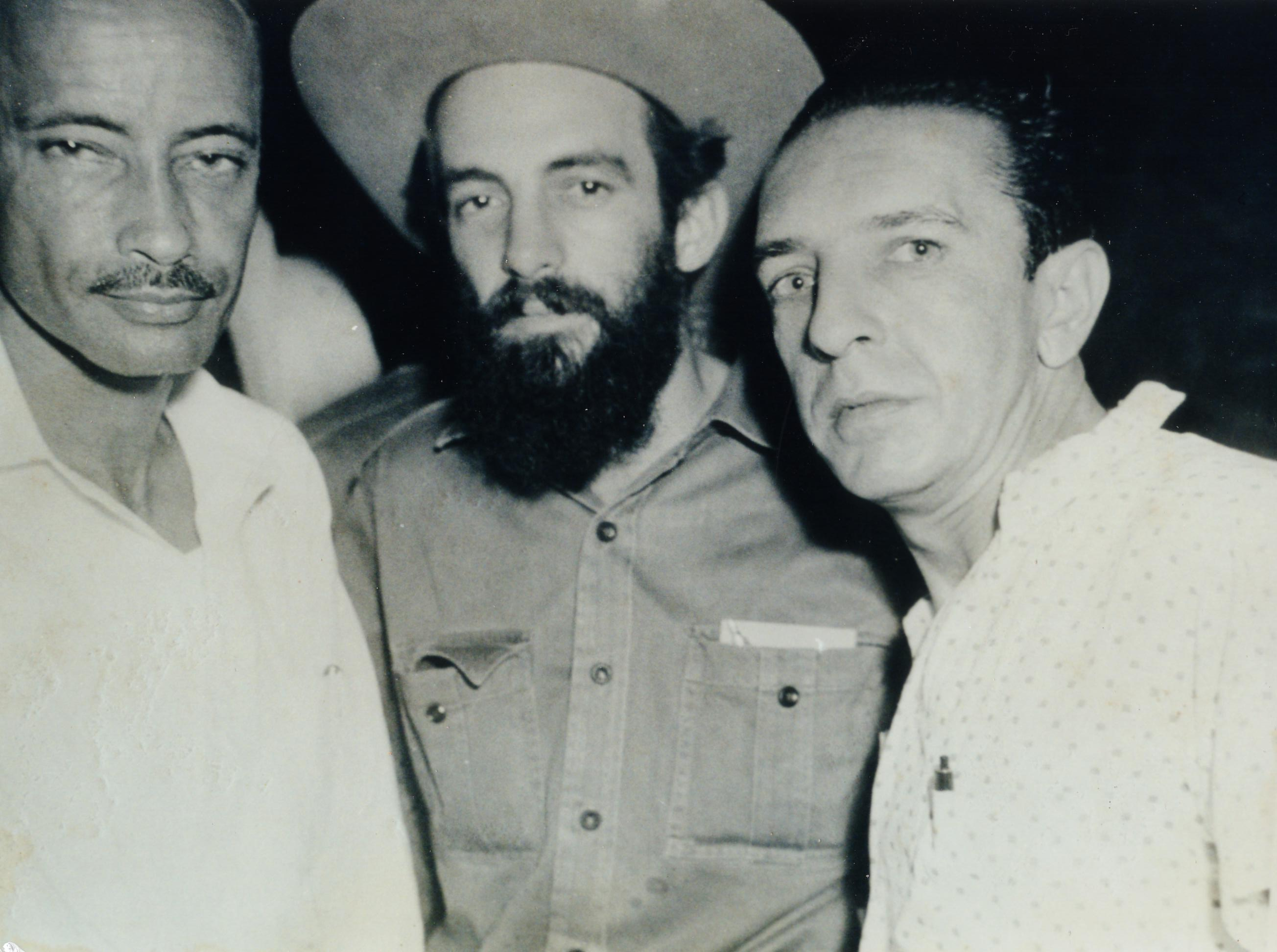
Robert A. Paneque (left), Camilo Cienfuegos (center), and Ronaldo Abello (right)

To Cuban-American historian Samuel Farber, Cienfuegos "exemplified the quintessential native, male, urban Cuban with his sense of humor, great interest in dancing and baseball, good looks, love of women, and overall joie de vivre". According to British historian Hugh Thomas, Cienfuegos, "with his open, jovial manner and warm smile, bid fair to become almost as popular as Castro himself". To American historian Robert E. Quirk, Cienfuegos' "easygoing and friendly demeanor and Old Testament beard combined to project a popular counterimage alongside that of the July 26 leader."

United States ambassador Earl E. T. Smith, who met Cienfuegos at Camp Columbia in January 1959, thought him to be "courteous if aloof". To Smith's successor Philip Bonsal, "Cienfuegos was gay and forthcoming. He had proved himself as a leader of men but he did not have any irresistible urge to the exercise of power. He liked the fleshpots, the gay life. He may have had a penchant for friendships and associations deemed undesirable by some of his more austere revolutionary comrades." While to the British ambassador Leycester Coltman "Camilo's austere figure, black beard, and gentle, dignified manner gave him an even more Christ-like appearance than Castro."

Finance Minister Raúl Chibás described him as "a childlike fellow, always playing with guns", while his successor Rufo López-Fresquet described him as a "gay, happy-go-lucky, adventuresome sort". The newspaper Bohemia also compared him to Robinson Crusoe. Cienfuegos' "devil-may-care personality" was often contrasted with Guevara's "strictness", although the two would become fast friends after joining the revolutionary leadership.

=== Political ideology ===
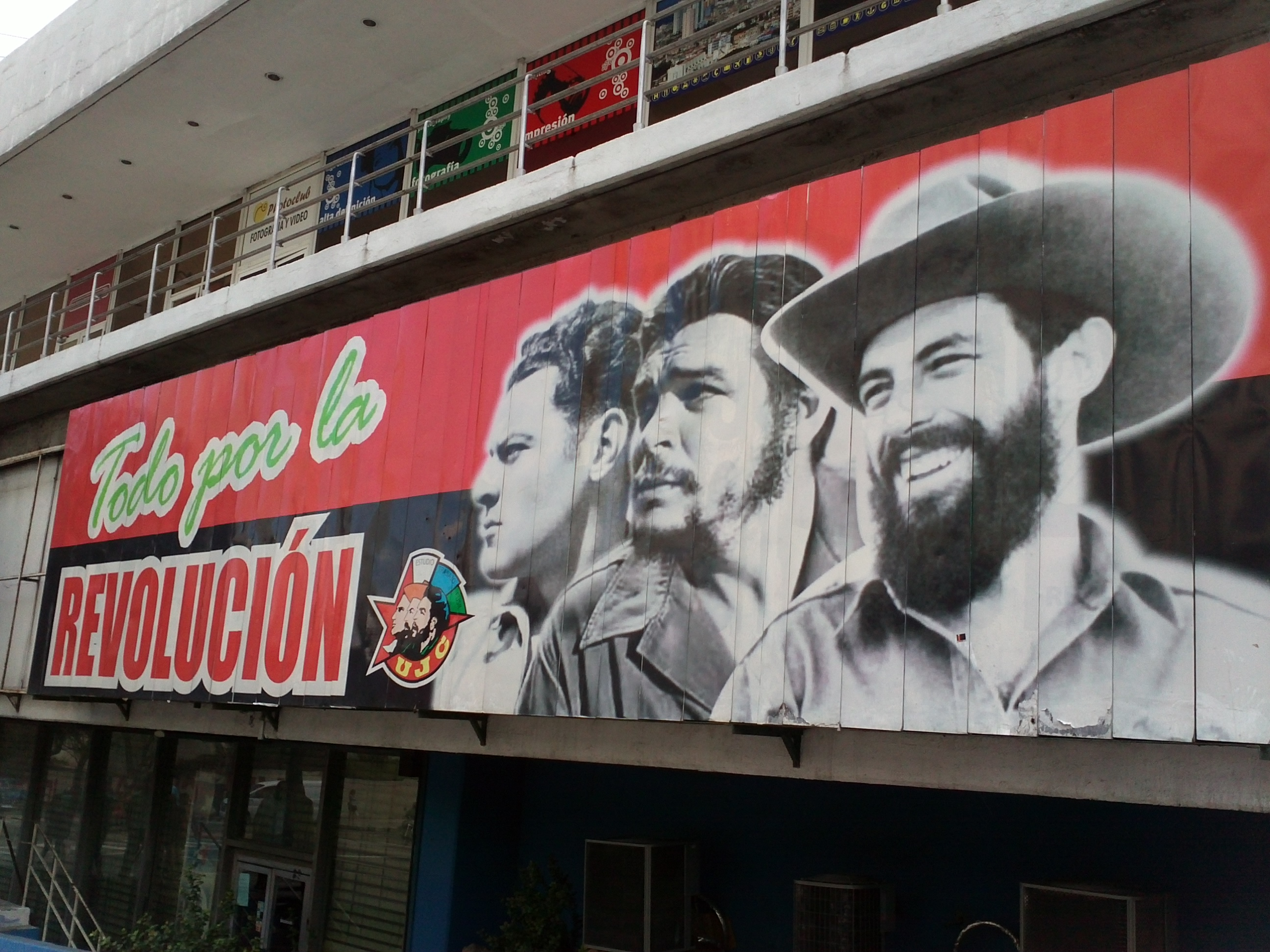
Mural depicting Julio Antonio Mella (left), Che Guevara (middle), and Camilo Cienfuegos (right)

Cienfuegos was not openly committed to any political ideology and appeared not to hold any strong political beliefs, although he remained personally loyal to Castro. Farber commented that he "remained less politically sophisticated than the Castro brothers as well as Che Guevara." Cienfuegos himself considered the Cuban Revolution to have been anti-authoritarian and "non-Communist", and continued to reiterate this view even after Castro's line on the matter changed. To Cienfuegos, the Revolution was "cubanísima [Cuban to the extreme] [...] as Cuban as the palm trees, uniquely and exclusively Cuban." This was the version of the revolution that he vowed to die for "whenever the moment should demand it".

Many have speculated about his possible communist allegiances, but no solid evidence of such has been found. Although described as a "closet Communist" by The New York Times journalist Tad Szulc, to Castro's biographer Georgie Anne Geyer, "[t]hat Camilo was far more a romantic revolutionary than a Communist is beyond question." While Fidel Castro himself described Cienfuegos as "a pure revolutionary soul, Communist timber", he also speculated that he could have been removed from command due to his "low political level". Others claimed him to be an anti-communist or referred to him in neutral terms. Some have also pointed out the influence of his older brother Osmany Cienfuegos, who was a committed communist.

The son of Spanish anarchists, many within the international anarchist movement claimed Cienfuegos himself to have also been an anarchist. The Cuban government even played up his libertarian credentials in order to garner international support. But Cuban-American historian Frank Fernández has disputed this characterisation, questioning whether Cienfuegos was ever involved with the Cuban anarchist movement.

=== Leadership style ===
Few men have succeeded in leaving on every action such a distinctive personal mark. He had the natural intelligence of the people, who had chosen him out of thousands for a privileged position on account of the audacity of his blows, his tenacity, his intelligence, and unequalled devotion. Camilo practiced loyalty like a religion.

— Che Guevara

During the Cuban Revolution, he quickly distinguished himself as one of the most popular revolutionary leaders. As a key lieutenant of Fidel Castro, Cienfuegos was comparable in rank and fame to Che Guevara and Raúl Castro, in some cases even being considered second only to Fidel himself. Although his campaign in Las Villas was not as well-conducted as Guevara's, Cienfuegos' actions in the last months of the war earned him particular distinction as a revolutionary leader.

While a capable military commander, Cienfuegos never demonstrated an authoritarian desire to exercise power over others. After the revolution, Cienfuegos was remembered fondly by his soldiers, who compared his affectionate leadership style to that of a parent or a teacher, rather than that of a "chief", recalling that "he even insisted that prisoners should eat first". On the question of tactics, he departed from many others in the revolutionary movement in rejecting violence and revenge. In October 1958, when a Cuban Masonic organization expressed concern that someone captured by the rebels might be tortured and killed, he replied that he would not even have considered such an act, which he thought would have lowered the revolutionaries' methods to the level of their opponents.

== Legacy ==
=== Speculation about disappearance ===
Almost immediately after Cienfuegos disappeared, many people began to speculate about the events and some even suspected foul play. The pilot of Cienfuegos' plane had been inexperienced, and although the government claimed that the plane had been taken down by a squall, the weather that day had actually been clear for flying. The area that his plane was flying would also have been covered by radar. The captain of the base that Cienfuegos' plane took off from, Roberto de Cárdenas, alleged that the flight's fate had been plotted, claiming that nobody had seen Cienfuegos in the airplane and that others on the base were either killed or overpowered.

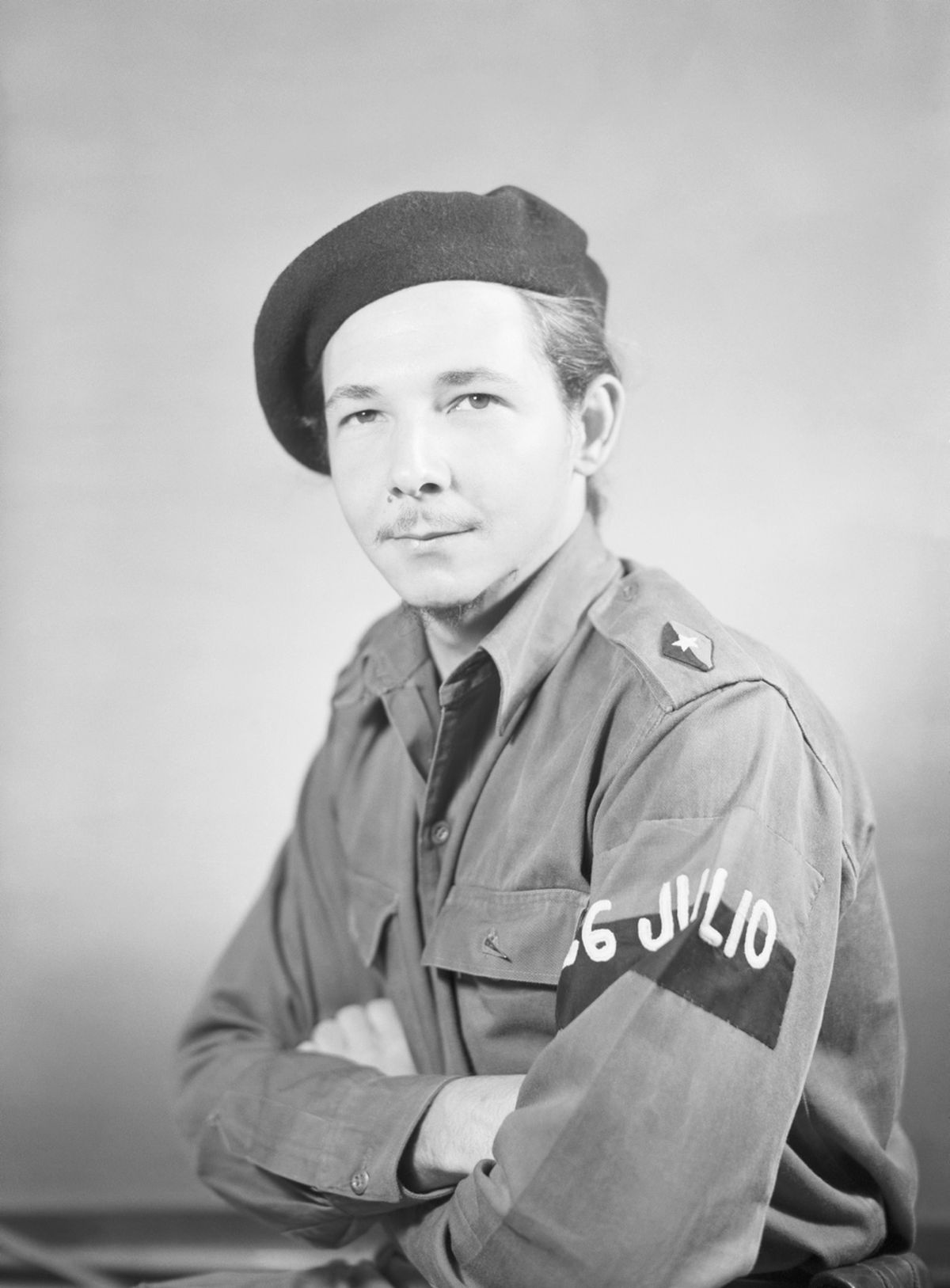
Raúl Castro, who was suspected by some of having assassinated Cienfuegos

Some alleged he had been assassinated by his rival Raúl Castro. Proponents of this hypothesis included Huber Matos himself, who was convinced that his arrest and Camilo's disappearance were related. Carlos Franqui suspected the intelligence agent Osvaldo Sánchez, who had been charged with ensuring the security of Cienfuegos by Raúl Castro. Others suspected that Fidel Castro himself ordered the assassination of Cienfuegos, speculating that it had something to do with his apparent reluctance to arrest Matos, or that Cienfuegos was growing too popular for Castro's liking. Some skeptics speculated that Castro had falsely announced that Cienfuegos was found in order to gauge the public's feelings about him.

Some critics of Castro claimed that while he had not killed Cienfuegos himself, "one of the specialties of Fidel is to send people to be killed." José Pardo Llada, who was with Castro during the search for Cienfuegos, later said that "He [Castro] may not have killed Camilo, but he certainly didn't feel his death". Che Guevara himself never suspected the Castros of involvement in Cienfuegos' disappearance and remained personally loyal to Fidel for years afterwards. Philip Bonsal also never considered foul play by the Castros to have been a possibility, as he believed that "Cienfuegos was no threat to any one."

Another speculation was that his plane had been mistaken for a hostile aircraft and shot down by a Cuban Air Force pilot. There has also been speculation that Cienfuegos faked his death and fled to the US, as some speculate it may have been to Ybor City in Tampa. In 1960, a former nurse from Havana that had fled to Miami claimed she had nursed Cienfuegos, but she was later declared "insane". British historian Hugh Thomas himself speculated whether the mystery of Cienfuegos' disappearance would ever be solved.

=== Friends and family ===
Shortly after Camilo's death, his brother Osmany Cienfuegos was appointed Minister of Public Works, replacing the engineer Manuel Ray Rivero. He served in the position until February 1966, when he was appointed president of the Communist Party's foreign relations commission. He also joined the Central Committee of the Communist Party of Cuba and, in 1976, became a member of the Council of State and secretary of the Council of Ministers.

Che Guevara named his son Camilo after Cienfuegos and kept a picture of him on his study wall after leaving Cuba. Guevara also dedicated his 1961 book Guerrilla Warfare to Cienfuegos, a picture of whom adorned the cover.

=== Memorial dedications ===
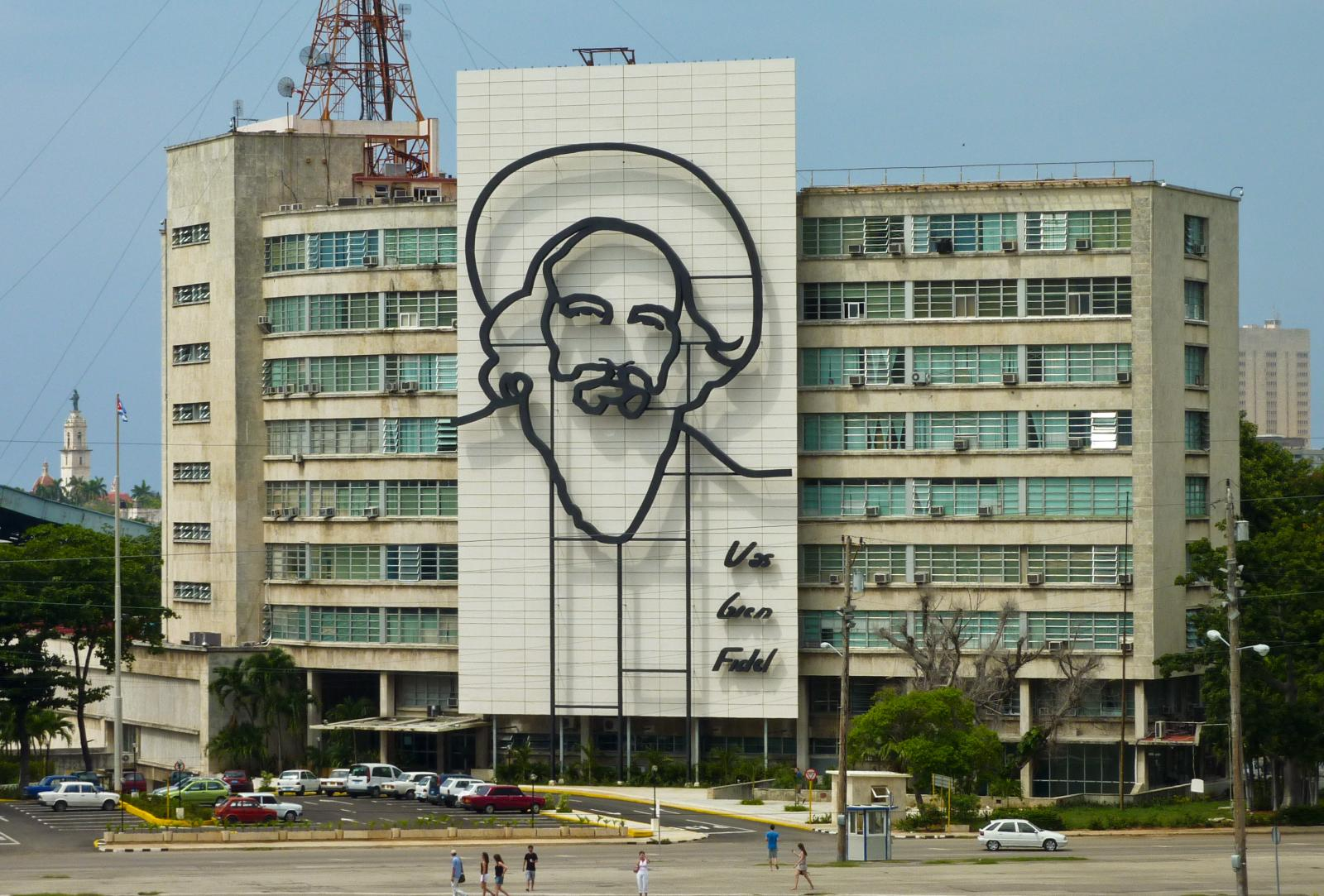
Steel outline of Cienfuegos on the Ministry of Communications (2011)

On 28 October each year, school children throughout Cuba throw flowers into the sea or a river to honor Camilo Cienfuegos, repeating the spontaneous tribute of the Cubans who tossed flowers into the ocean when they heard his plane had been lost over the Cuba Florida Strait. To mark the 50th anniversary of his death, on 28 October 2009, a steel outline of Cienfuegos' face and the words "Vas bien, Fidel" were added to the side of the Ministry of Communications building on the Plaza de la Revolución.

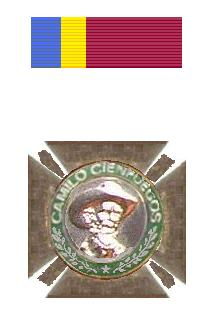
Order of Cienfuegos

After the revolution, streets and buildings throughout Cuba were renamed after heroes of the Revolution, including Cienfuegos himself. A village previously known as "Hershey", in the municipality of Santa Cruz del Norte, was renamed to Camilo Cienfuegos in his honour. A museum dedicated to Cienfuegos was built in Yaguajay, at the site of the barracks of the Batista's forces during the 1958 battle. The museum includes a diorama of the battle, as well as material relating to Cienfuegos' life before, during, and after the revolution. A large statue of him stands in front of the museum.

As part of a campaign to improve the standards of living in rural areas, in July 1960, Fidel Castro dedicated the Camilo Cienfuegos Mountain Boarding School, which was established as a school for the largely-uneducated peasant children of the Sierra Maestra. In 1966, the Camilo Cienfuegos Military Schools System was also established to provide military education to students aged 11 to 17. Graduates from these high schools received priority admission to cadet schools, such that within five years, 74% of students at the military technological institute were graduates from the Camilo Cienfuegos Schools. The University of Matanzas also bears the name "Camilo Cienfuegos".

On 10 December 1979, the Cuban government decreed the establishment of the Order of Cienfuegos, a socialist order of merit named in his honour. Camilo is also remembered on the 20 Cuban peso bill and the 20 Cuban convertible peso bill. He was also pictured on the 40-cent coins, now discontinued.

=== Popular culture ===
Cienfuegos has also been depicted on revolutionary murals, which sometimes assigned to him a religious significance. In the 2008 film Che, the character of Cienfuegos was "played with great verve" by Santiago Cabrera.

== See also ==
- List of people who disappeared mysteriously at sea

== Bibliography ==
- Anderson, Jon Lee (1997). Che Guevara: A Revolutionary Life. Grove Press. ISBN 0-8021-3558-7. LCCN 97-3993.
- Barrio, Hilda; Jenkins, Gareth, eds. (2003). The Che Handbook. St. Martin's Press. ISBN 0-312-32246-1.
- Bonsal, Philip W. (1971). Cuba, Castro, and the United States. University of Pittsburgh Press. ISBN 0-8229-3225-3. LCCN 72-151505.
- Bourne, Peter G. (1986). Fidel: A Biography of Fidel Castro. New York City: Dodd, Mead & Co. ISBN 0-396-08518-0. LCCN 86-9039.
- Coltman, Leycester (2003). The Real Fidel Castro. New Haven and London: Yale University Press. ISBN 0-300-10188-0. LCCN 2003012942.
- Domínguez, Jorge I. (1978). Cuba: Order and Revolution. Harvard University Press. ISBN 0-674-17925-0. LCCN 78-8288.
- Farber, Samuel (2006). The Origins of the Cuban Revolution Reconsidered. University of North Carolina. ISBN 978-0-8078-3001-7. LCCN 2005020671.
- Fernández, Frank (2001). Cuban Anarchism: The History of a Movement. Translated by Bufe, Charles. Tucson, Arizona: See Sharp Press. ISBN 1-884365-19-1.
- García-Pérez, Gladys Marel (1998). Insurrection & Revolution: Armed Struggle in Cuba, 1952–1959. Translated by Ortega, Juan. Lynne Rienner Publishers. ISBN 1-55587-611-0. LCCN 97-49997.
- Geyer, Georgie Anne (1991). Guerrilla Prince: The Untold Story of Fidel Castro. Little, Brown & Company. ISBN 0-316-30893-5. LCCN 90-46379.
- Guerra, Lillian (2012). Visions of Power in Cuba: Revolution, Redemption, and Resistance, 1959-1971. University of North Carolina Press. ISBN 978-0-8078-3563-0. LCCN 2012004090.
- López-Fresquet, Rufo (1966). My 14 Months with Castro. World Publishing Company. LCCN 66-21126.
- Quirk, Robert E. (1993). Fidel Castro. New York and London: W.W. Norton & Company. ISBN 0-393-03485-2. LCCN 92-39300.
- Thomas, Hugh (1970). Cuba: The Pursuit of Freedom. New York: Harper & Row. ISBN 0-06-014259-6. LCCN 70-108189.
