= John Gilman =

John Gilman may refer to:

- John Gilman (activist) (1920–2011), American activist
- John J. Gilman (1925–2009), American material scientist
- John M. Gilman (1824–1906), American politician and lawyer
- John Taylor Gilman (1753–1828), American farmer, shipbuilder and politician
- Jonathan Gillman (born 1935), Australian sharp shooter
