= Order of Cienfuegos =

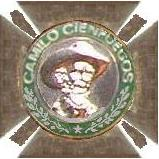
- The Order of Cienfuegos
- Type: Single-grade order
- Presented by: Republic of Cuba
- Eligibility: Citizens of Cuba (members of the FAR)
- Status: Active
- Established: 1979
- Related: Order of José Martí; Hero of the Republic of Cuba

The Order of Cienfuegos is a socialist order of Cuba. It is named after the revolutionary Camilo Cienfuegos Gorriarán.

The order is awarded to members of the Revolutionary Armed Forces of Cuba. Either in the active military service, in the reserve or retired, and it was awarded to the military of "friendly countries" like the Soviet Union, for "extraordinary merit in planning or accomplishing combat actions, in defense of the achievements and sovereignty of Cuba".

== Statute ==
The statutes of the Order of Cienfuegos mention specific circumstances where the order can be awarded.

Article 1. The ORDER "CAMILO CIENFUEGOS" is awarded to the members of the Revolutionary Armed Forces in the active military service, in the reserve and retired, as well as to the military of friendly countries, for extraordinary merit in developing and accomplishing combat actions, in defense of the achievements and sovereignty of our socialist country.

Article 2. The ORDER "CAMILO CIENFUEGOS" is made of gilt metal.

Article 3. The ORDER "CAMILO CIENFUEGOS" is conferred in recognition of the following types of merit:

- a) shooting down a bomber or a fighter-bomber by the means of the Air Force;
- b) shooting down two armored helicopters or three transport helicopters by the means of the Air Force;
- c) shooting down three or more bombers or fighter-bombers by the means of anti-aircraft missiles or contributing to their destruction in the complex conditions of the situation in the air;
- ch) shooting down two or more aircraft or helicopters by the means of the anti-aircraft artillery;
- d) destroying three or more enemy tanks or armored carriers;
- e) sinking three or more enemy barges or transportation or personal amphibious vehicles;
- f) neutralizing an enemy artillery group;
- g) destroying two or more tanks or pieces of artillery with the support of tanks or armored vehicles;
- h) sinking a transportation barge for troops, combat equipment or artillery support by the means of small firearms;
- i) capturing and fetching to our lines important enemy arms or equipment;
- j) destroying a submarine or a supporting barge;
- k) removing, under the enemy fire, damaged vital parts of equipment or arms;
- l) successfully assisting, under the enemy fire, in a combat action of the unit or subunit;
- ll) assisting at the risk of one's life the commander of the unit during the combat, accomplishing combat objective with him;
- m) annihilating superior enemy forces while commanding the unit or subunit with its forces and means;
- n) destroying at the direct risk of life the enemy equipment or arms thus securing the success of our troops;
- ñ) saving the life of comrades at the direct risk of one's life;
- o) achieving combat success resulting from participation in the planning of combat actions and distinguished commanding the troops;
- p) demonstrating other deeds or acts of personal valor and bravery.

Article 9:The order may be conferred posthumously

=== Insignia ===
The cross of the order is pinned on the breast. It is made of gilded silver. The ribbon is blue, yellow and crimson.

== See also ==
- Orders, decorations, and medals of Cuba
