= Friendship Medal (Cuba) =

- Type: Medal
- Presented by: the Republic of Cuba
- Eligibility: Foreigners

The Friendship Medal (Spanish: La Medalla de la Amistad) is conferred by the Council of State of Cuba on foreigners for their solidarity with the Cuban Revolution, or who have contributed to peace and the progress of humankind.

The medal is gold colored with the word "Amistad" (Friendship) in the center (with a single star above the writing). It is surrounded by a garland wreath. The medal hangs on a ribbon of vertical red, white and blue stripes.

== Recipients ==
1. Estella Bravo, US Documentary Filmmaker (29 December 2016)
2. Ernesto Bravo, US Documentary Filmmaker (29 December 2016)
3. Danny Glover, Film star and activist (29 December 2016)
4. Duong Minh, Vietnamese Ambassador to Cuba (9 December 2016)
5. Zhang Tuo, China's ambassador to Cuba (13 October 2016)
6. Jean Pierre Bel, personal envoy of the President of France for Latin America and the Caribbean (25 October 2016)
7. Maria do Socorro Gomes, president of the World Council for Peace (CMP) (21 September 2016)
8. Nazir Rizvi, chairman of the Canada-Cuba Friendship Association and a member of the Central Committee of the Communist Party of Canada (1 December 2015)
9. Valentina Tereshkova (2012)
10. Juan Arenas, Spanish Ambassador to Cuba (13 December 2013)
11. Arnaldo Goenaba Barron, Cuban-American and leader of the July 26th Movement in the United States (30 July 2012)
12. Gloria La Riva, American activist and writer (2010)
13. Elijah Mudenda (2005)
14. John Gilman (2004)
15. Michael Lapsley, Anglican priest from New Zealand and South African anti-apartheid activist (1996)
16. Lisa Makarchuk, Canadian who worked at the English language service of Radio Havana Cuba

== See also ==
- Orders, decorations, and medals of Cuba
