= Order (distinction) =

Visible honour awarded to an individual recipient

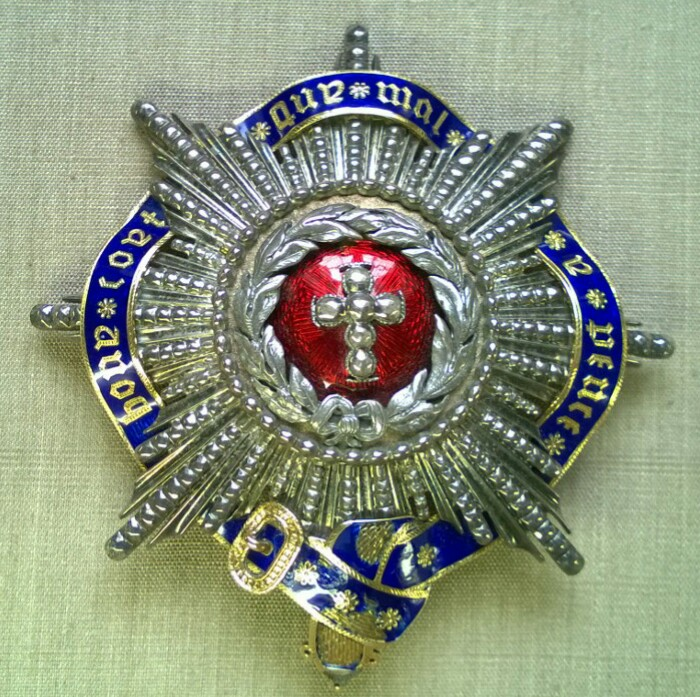
Star of the Order of the Elephant (Elefantordenen), Denmark's highest-ranked honour

An order is a visible honour awarded by a sovereign state, monarch, dynastic house or organisation to a person, typically in recognition of individual merit, that often comes with distinctive insignia such as collars, medals, badges, and sashes worn by recipients.

Modern honour systems of state orders and dynastic orders emerged from the culture of orders of chivalry of the Middle Ages, which in turn emerged from the Catholic religious orders.

== Terminology ==
The word order (Latin: ordo), in the case referred to in this article, can be traced back to the chivalric orders, including the military orders, which in turn trace the name of their organisation back to that of the Catholic religious orders.

Orders began to be created ad hoc and in a more courtly nature. Some were merely honorary and gradually the badges of these orders (i.e. the association) began to be known informally as orders. As a result, the modern distinction between orders and decorations or insignia has become somewhat blurred. While some orders today retain the original notion of being an association or society of individuals, others make no distinction, and an "order" may even be the name of a decoration.

Most historic chivalric orders imply a membership in a group, typically a confraternity. In a few exclusive European orders, membership is or was also limited in number. Decorations seldom have such limitations. Orders often come in multiple classes, including knights and dames in imitation of the original chivalric orders.

== History ==
Modern national orders, orders of merit, and decorations, emerged from the culture of chivalric orders established in the Middle Ages, originally the military orders of the Middle Ages and the Crusades, who in turn grew out of the original Catholic religious orders.

While these chivalric orders were "societies, fellowships and colleges of knights", founded by the Holy See or European monarchs in imitation of the military orders of the Crusades, granting membership in such societies gradually developed into an honour that could be bestowed in recognition of service or to ensure the loyalty of a certain clientele. Some of modern Europe's highest honours, such as the Order of the Golden Fleece (established 1430), England's Order of the Garter (1348), Denmark's Order of the Elephant (1693) and Scotland's Order of the Thistle (1687), were created during that era. They were essentially courtly in nature, characterised by close personal relations between the orders' members and the orders' sovereign.

In the contemporary era, 96% of the world's states – 196 out of a sample of 204 polities, which includes sovereignty-claiming entities like Abkhazia – were found to use Orders to bestow them upon their own citizens and, as a diplomatic tool, upon foreigners. In total, 133 states even regulate the use of Orders in their constitutions. Only Switzerland, Micronesia, Libya, the Marshall Islands, Nauru, Palau, and the Seychelles do not seem to confer official civil orders of merit.

== Orders by fount of honour ==
=== Dynastic orders ===
By the time of the Renaissance, most European monarchs had either acquired an existing order of chivalry, or created new ones of their own, to reward loyal civilian and especially military officials. Such orders remained out of reach to the general public, however, as being of noble rank or birth was usually a prerequisite to being admitted.

In the 18th century, these ideas gradually changed and the orders developed from "honourable societies" to visible honours. An example of this gradual development can be seen in two orders founded by Maria Theresa of Austria. While the Military Order of Maria Theresa (1757) was open to any deserving military officer regardless of social origin, and would grant titles of nobility to those who did not already have them, the Order of Saint Stephen of Hungary (1764) still required that one had to have at least four generations of noble ancestors.

Still today, many dynastic orders are granted by royal families to worthy individuals for service and achievements.

== Orders by type ==
=== Orders of merit ===
In 1802 Napoleon created the Legion of Honour (Légion d'honneur), which could be awarded to any person, regardless of status, for bravery in combat or for 20 years of distinguished service. While still retaining many trappings of an order of chivalry, it was the first modern national order of merit and is still France's highest award today. The French Legion of Honour served as the model for numerous modern orders of merit in the Western world, such as the Order of Leopold in Belgium (1832) and the Order of the British Empire in the United Kingdom (1917). Orders of merit based on the French Legion of Honour typically retain five classes in accordance with habits of chivalric orders.

In communist countries, orders of merit usually come in one to three grades, with only a badge worn with or without a ribbon on the chest. An example of a communist order of merit was the one-class Order of Lenin of the Soviet Union (1930). Unlike Western orders, however, communist orders could be awarded more than once to an individual. After the collapse of the Soviet Bloc in the 1990s, most Eastern European countries reverted to the Western-style orders originally established before the rise of communism.

Today, many countries have some form of order of merit or national decorations. Both Thailand's Order of the White Elephant and Japan's Order of the Rising Sun are over 100 years old. In Canada and some Commonwealth Realms, the Order of Merit is the highest civilian honour. Canada has the Order of Canada and provincial orders such as the Order of Nova Scotia. Australia has the Order of Australia, and New Zealand awards the Order of New Zealand and the New Zealand Order of Merit. The Order of Mapungubwe is the highest honour in South Africa, while the Orders of Luthuli, and the Baobab exist alongside other decorations. The United States awards the Medal of Honor to members of its military for acts of valour, and the Presidential Medal of Freedom and the Congressional Gold Medal to civilians. The Legion of Merit is the only United States decoration which may be issued in award degrees (much like an order of chivalry or certain orders of merit), but award degrees are only made to foreign nationals, typically senior military officers or government officials.

Switzerland does not award any orders. Article 12 of the 1848 Swiss Constitution prohibited the acceptance of honours and titles by Swiss citizens. The current Constitution of 1999 has no specific prohibition, but a federal statute effectively continues the prohibition by barring holders of foreign orders from holding public office. This practice has become common across the globe (albeit other countries usually issue a general prohibition to accept foreign orders, allowing for generous exceptions). Australia, for instance, bans the acceptance of honors from other sovereigns unless the honorific order comes from a list of countries specified in a regulation.

In 1974 the Cabinet of Sweden passed a regulation forbidding the monarch of Sweden from awarding membership in orders to Swedish citizens. The orders themselves were not abolished, but only the Royal Orders of the Seraphim and the Polar Star (both established in 1748) continued to be awarded, and only to foreign citizens and stateless individuals. In 1995 the regulation was altered, allowing the monarch to bestow the two remaining active orders to members of the Swedish royal family. Finally, in 2022, the 48-year-old regulation was repealed by the Swedish Government, the orders were re-opened to Swedish citizens, and the two dormant orders (Sword and Vasa) were revived, with effect from 2023.

Modern orders are usually open to all citizens of a particular country, regardless of status, sex, race or creed; there may be a minimum age for eligibility. Nominations are made either by private citizens or by government officials, depending on the country. An order may be revoked if the holder is convicted of a crime or renounces citizenship. Some people nominated for an award refuse it.

== See also ==
- Military orders, awards and decorations
- Civil awards and decorations
- Ecclesiastical decoration
- Fraternal order
- Religious order
- Phaleristics
- Socialist orders of merit
