= National deviationism =

Label applied to non-Russian opponents of the Soviet Union

National deviationism (Russian: национал-уклонизм, romanized: nazional-uklonism) was a label applied to non-Russian opponents of the regime within the Soviet Union, to discredit them by associating them with external enemies. In the 1930s this accusation was also closely linked to accusations of assistance to foreign intelligence services in an attempt to facilitate the return of the old order, and was closely linked to the term of bourgeois nationalism.
