= Herbert Matthews =

American reporter (1900–1977)

Herbert Lionel Matthews (January 10, 1900 – July 30, 1977) was a reporter and editorialist for The New York Times who won widespread attention after revealing that the 30-year-old Fidel Castro was still alive and living in the Sierra Maestra mountains. President Fulgencio Batista claimed publicly that the young guerrilla leader had been killed during the landing of the yacht Granma, bringing him and others back to Cuba from Mexico in December 1956.

== Early life ==
The grandson of Jewish immigrants, Matthews was born and raised on Riverside Drive on the Upper West Side of Manhattan. He volunteered for the Army near the end of World War I and graduated from Columbia College of Columbia University. He subsequently joined the New York Times and reported from Europe during the Spanish Civil War.

His coverage of that war and later the Cuban political situation were subject to substantial criticism for showing communist sympathies, a charge Matthews rejected for years, although the pro-Soviet magazine New Masses insisted that he should have won a Pulitzer Prize for "dramatic and fearless reporting [that] has set a new high in foreign correspondence." He also reported during the Italian conquest of Ethiopia in 1936; and then wrote Eyewitness in Abyssinia: With Marshal Bodoglio's forces to Addis Ababa in 1937. During this time, he remarked that he viewed history as a series of scrimmages for which he picked a favorite side, regardless of morals or values. He admitted: "the right or the wrong of it did not interest me greatly." This contributed to him being labeled a fascist.

== Coverage of the Spanish Civil War ==
Matthews was sent to Spain by the New York Times in March 1937. Constancia de la Mora, head of the Republican Press Office, described him as “Tall, lean, and lanky, […] one of the shyest, most diffident men in Spain. He used to come in every evening, always dressed in his grey flannels, after arduous and dangerous trips to the front, to telephone his story to Paris, whence it was cabled to New York.” According to Paul Preston, during the initial Republican offensive to recapture Teruel, in December 1937 “. . . Matthews would drive each day from Valencia to the battle-front in bitterly cold conditions, with Hemingway, Tom Delmer and Robert Capa. They drove nearly three thousand miles, and produced scoop after scoop . . . ” He left Spain after the Republican defeat at the Battle of the Ebro in November 1938.

== Interview with Fidel Castro ==
When the world had given us up for dead, the interview with Matthews put the lie to our disappearance.

— Che Guevara, January 1958

In February 1957, Matthews was invited to Cuba to interview Fidel Castro, leader of the Cuban Revolution. Ruby Phillips, the correspondent in Havana for The New York Times at the time, had received information from an emissary of the 26th of July Movement that Castro wanted to meet with a reporter from one of the most influential papers in the United States. Phillips initially wanted to do the interview herself, but Castro's emissary discouraged her because of the "difficult conditions" of the Sierra and recommended that a man be sent instead. She agreed, and Matthews seized this opportunity granted to him by Cuban machismo.

The interview was conducted in secret so that Fulgencio Batista, the President of Cuba at the time, would not find out about their meeting. Matthews' interview revealed that Fidel Castro was alive, despite claims by Batista that he had been killed the previous year. This was a shock not only to the United States and Cuba, but also to revolutionaries in Cuba, giving them hope that the revolution could continue. If their leader was still alive, so was the revolution. In the interview, Castro misled Matthews into believing that his rebel force, now engaged in guerrilla warfare as a tactic, was much bigger and more powerful than previously believed. Matthews' portrayal of the army made it seem as though Castro had a large following and that the majority of the Cuban population was aligned with him. Both Castro and Matthews understood how surprising the news of his survival would be, so they made a point of taking a picture together and Castro signed the interview, just to add proof of the event. Batista, still trying to crush the uprising by revolutionary forces in Cuba, claimed the photograph was a fake and continued to assert that Castro was dead.

The interview has been described as one of the greatest journalistic scoops of the 20th century, both for the information that Castro had survived and the historical context in which the interview was conducted. Despite the death of Stalin, the United States was still engaged in the Cold War to prevent the spread of Communist regimes and the communist ideology, and there was strong anti-Communist sentiment throughout the country. Referring to Castro's army and revolutionary force, Matthews denied any link with Communism. In his article, published on 24 February 1957, he wrote of Castro

[His] program is vague and couched in generalities, but it amounts to a new deal for Cuba, radical, democratic, and therefore anti-Communist. The real core of its strength is that it is fighting against the military dictatorship of President Batista.

Matthews' early claim that Castro was driving an anti-Communist revolution would soon affect not only the image of Castro and the revolution, but also affect how the United States acted toward Cuba in the upcoming years.

== Matthews in the Cuban Revolution ==
Matthews' articles in The New York Times played a significant role in U.S. foreign policy at the time, as in 1958, the articles, which consistently demonstrated the idea that Castro would hold free elections and restore the Cuban constitution, helped persuade Washington to cease the shipment of arms to Batista. Instead, Matthews wanted the United States to spend its energy providing some kind of Marshall Plan for Latin America. The State Department believed Matthews in his claims that Castro was not a Communist leader, and the constant presence of Castro in the news increased the awareness of the revolution in the United States. Within the United States, as journalist and historian Anthony DePalma states, "Castro's dark past was largely replaced in the United States by instant legitimacy". Matthews had turned Castro into a likable rebel.

Throughout 1959, Matthews visited Cuba several times and constantly continued to deny that Castro was a Communist. He said that Castro's revolution itself was not inherently Communist, and that Castro simply wanted a full-blown social revolution. One of Matthews' most famous statements concerning Castro was made on 5 July 1959, and he stated that:

There are no Reds in the Cabinet and none in high positions in the Government or army in the sense of being able to control either governmental or defense policies. The only power worth considering in Cuba is in the hands of the Premier Castro, who is not only not Communist but decidedly anti-Communist…

As the Cuban revolution continued, Matthews still attempted to prove that Castro's revolution and regime were not linked to Communism, but in 1960, Castro declared that he would adopt the Communist ideals to reshape Cuban society. Matthews continued to state that the revolution itself had never been associated with Communism and that Castro had not been a Communist when he took power. However, Matthews' efforts were futile, as many, both in the United States and in Cuba, "blamed" him for the rise of the Communist leader. Several believed that he had known Castro was a Communist, while the some in the State Department said that Matthews had led them to believe Castro had democratic intentions and thus postponed their ability to act on the growing Communism. Matthews' views even attracted the personal attention of Vice President Richard Nixon. Nixon called FBI Director J. Edgar Hoover on July 16, 1959 to inquire if Matthews assessments matched those of the FBI. Hoover was suspicious of Matthews' personal politics, and wrote of Matthews that "one can't get much closer to communism without becoming one." There were few academics who did not discredit Matthews' views, and his more opinionated journalistic style was frowned upon.

== Legacy ==
Matthews' later journalism has been likened to that of three other US foreign correspondents who covered wars and revolutions from the "other side" and became controversial figures by openly demonstrating their sympathy for the enemy and the revolutionaries: Richard Harding Davis, John Reed, and Edgar Snow reported, respectively, on the Russo-Japanese War (1905–1907), the Russian Revolution and the 1949 Communist Revolution in China. The conservative National Review published a caricature of Castro with the caption, "I got my job through the New York Times," parodying a contemporary campaign for the newspaper's classified ad section.

In 2017, the British historian Paul Preston referred to Matthews as "the great New York Times correspondent" regarding his coverage of the Spanish Civil War.

In 1997, on the fortieth anniversary of Matthews' interview with Fidel Castro, a three-foot-tall marker was erected by the government on the spot where they met and talked. It reads: "In this place, commander-in-chief Fidel Castro Ruz met with the North American journalist Herbert Matthews on February 17, 1957". Ten years later, in February 2007, Cuba's state news agency reported that Cuba had unveiled a plaque in the Sierra Maestra to commemorate the 50th anniversary of the interview.

== Bibliography ==
=== Works by Herbert L. Matthews (1900-1977) ===
- Matthews, Herbert Lionel (1937) Eyewitness in Abyssinia, London: Martin Secker & Warburg Ltd.
- Matthews, Herbert Lionel (1938) Two Wars and More to Come, New York: Carrick & Evans, Inc.
- Matthews, Herbert Lionel (1943) The Fruits of Fascism, New York: Harcourt, Brace and Company
- Matthews, Herbert Lionel (1946) The Education of a Correspondent, New York: Harcourt, Brace and Company
- Matthews, Herbert Lionel (1961) The Cuban story, New York: George Braziller Inc. ASIN: B0007DNCMS
- Matthews, Herbert Lionel (1961) The yoke and the Arrows: A Report on Spain, New York: George Braziller Inc.; Rev. ed edition ASIN: B0007DFF7I
- Matthews, Herbert Lionel (1964) "Return to Cuba", A Special Issue Of Hispanic American Report, Stanford University, Institute of Hispanic American & Luso-Brazilian Studies
- Matthews, Herbert Lionel (1969) Castro: A Political Biography, New York: Simon & Schuster
- Matthews, Herbert Lionel (1969) Cuba, New York: The Macmillan Co; London: Collier-Macmillan
- Matthews, Herbert Lionel (1969) Fidel Castro, New York: Simon & Schuster and New York: Clarion Book
- Matthews, Herbert Lionel (1971) A World in Revolution, New York: Charles Scribner’s Sons
- Matthews, Herbert Lionel (1973) Half of Spain Died: A Reappraisal of the Spanish Civil War, New York: Scribner
- Matthews, Herbert Lionel (1975) Revolution in Cuba: An Essay in Understandings, New York: Charles Scribner's Sons

=== Works by others ===
(in chronological order)

- Welch, Richard E. (1984), "Herbert L. Matthews and the Cuban Revolution", The Historian Vol. 47
- De Palma, Anthony (2004), Myths of the Enemy: Castro, Cuba and Herbert L. Matthews of The New York Times, Notre Dame: University of Notre Dame.
- Koch, Stephen (2005), The Breaking Point: Hemingway, Dos Passos, and the Murder of Jose Robles, New York: Counterpoint Press ISBN 1-58243-280-5
- De Palma, Anthony (2006), The Man Who Invented Fidel, New York: Public Affairs. pp. 279–280. ISBN 1-58648-332-3.
- Radosh, Ronald (2006), "A Dictator's Scribe", National Review, July 2006. Archived from the original on 17 July 2006. Retrieved 21 November 2018.
