= Order of José Martí =

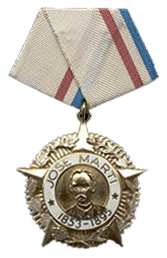
- Type: Single-grade order
- Presented by: the Republic of Cuba
- Eligibility: Citizens of Cuba, foreigners
- Status: Active
- Established: 1972
- Related: Order of Cienfuegos; Hero of the Republic of Cuba

The Order of José Martí (Spanish: Orden José Martí) is a state honor in Cuba. The Order was named so after José Martí, the national hero of Cuba. The design was realized by the Cuban sculptor José Delarra.

== Notable recipients ==
- Mahathir Mohamad, former Prime Minister of Malaysia
- Alexander Lukashenko, President of Belarus
- Mohammad Najibullah, former General Secretary of the People's Democratic Party of Afghanistan
- (Cuba) Armando Hart
- (Spain) Antonio Gades
- António Mascarenhas Monteiro, former President of Cape Verde
- Michael Manley, former Prime Minister of Jamaica
- Leonid Brezhnev, former General Secretary of the Communist Party of the Soviet Union
- Houari Boumédiène, former President of Algeria
- Ali Abdullah Saleh, former President of Yemen
- (North Korea) Kim Il Sung, former President of the Democratic People's Republic of Korea and former General Secretary of the Workers' Party of Korea
- Thomas Sankara, former President of Burkina Faso
- (People's Republic of Bulgaria) Todor Zhivkov, former General Secretary of the Bulgarian Communist Party and Chairman of the State Council of Bulgaria
- Salvador Allende, former President of Chile
- (Socialist Republic of Romania) Nicolae Ceaușescu former General Secretary of the Romanian Communist Party and President of Romania
- Owen Arthur, former Prime Minister of Barbados
- Hugo Chávez, former President of Venezuela
- (Czechoslovak Socialist Republic) Gustáv Husák, former General Secretary of the Communist Party of Czechoslovakia
- (People's Democratic Republic of Ethiopia) Mengistu Haile Mariam, former Chairman of the Ethiopian Communist military junta Derg and Head of State of Ethiopia
- (Puerto Rico) Rafael Cancel Miranda
- Robert Mugabe, former President of Zimbabwe
- Sam Nujoma, former President of Namibia
- Erich Honecker, former General Secretary of the Socialist Unity Party of Germany and Chairman of the State Council of the East Germany
- Felipe González, former Prime Minister of Spain
- Julius Nyerere, former President of Tanzania
- Omar Torrijos, former Military Leader of Panama
- Jacob Zuma, former President of South Africa.
- Viktor Yanukovych, former President of Ukraine
- Nguyễn Phú Trọng, former General Secretary of the Communist Party of Vietnam
- Tomislav Nikolić, former President of Serbia
- Vladimir Putin President of Russia
- (Mongolian People's Republic) Yumjaagiin Tsedenbal, former President of Mongolia and former General Secretary of the Mongolian People's Revolutionary Party
- Demetris Christofias, former President of Cyprus
- (Ba'athist Iraq) Saddam Hussein, former President of Iraq and former Secretary General of the Arab Socialist Ba'ath Party (Iraqi-dominated faction)
- Fanny Edelman, former honorary president of the Communist Party of Argentina
- Marien Ngouabi, former President of the People's Republic of the Congo
- Nicolás Maduro, President of Venezuela
- Nguyễn Xuân Phúc, former President of Vietnam
- João Bernardo Vieira, former President of Guinea-Bissau
- Andrés Manuel López Obrador, former President of Mexico
- Ralph Gonsalves, former Prime Minister of Saint Vincent and the Grenadines
- Tô Lâm, General Secretary of the Communist Party and President of Vietnam
- Keith Mitchell, former Prime Minister of Grenada

== See also ==
- International José Martí Prize
- José Martí
- Orders, decorations, and medals of Cuba
