= Raúl Chibás =

Cuban politician (1916–2002)

Minister of Finance
- In office 1959
- Preceded by: Alejandro Herrera Arango
- Succeeded by: Rufo López-Fresquet

Personal details
- Born: 25 April 1916 Santiago de Cuba, Cuba
- Died: 25 August 2002 (aged 86) Miami, Florida, U.S.
- Spouse: Maria Luisa Bonafonte
- Relations: Eduardo Chibás (brother)
- Children: 4
- Education: University of Havana
- Nickname: Masaboba

Raúl Chibás Ribas (April 25, 1916 – August 25, 2002) was a Cuban politician and military officer who initially supported Fidel Castro and the Cuban Revolution but later defected to the United States. Born in Santiago de Cuba, Chibás spent his childhood in Havana and attended the University of Havana. His older brother, Eduardo, founded and led the Orthodox Party (also known as the Cuban People's Party) in 1947. After Eduardo committed suicide in 1951, Raúl took over as party leader.

Chibás vehemently opposed the rule of Fulgencio Batista in the 1950s, and he supported the anti-Batista struggle of Fidel Castro. In July 1957, he signed the Sierra Manifesto, which proclaimed unity of the disparate anti-Batista groups. He served various positions for Castro's government after the revolution, including railroad commissioner, trial judge and Minister of Finance. He was a Major of the Cuban Army in 1960 when he decided to defect to the United States via a motor boat to Florida. Chibás felt that Castro had betrayed the ideals of the revolution.

Chibás became an active anti-Castro activist in the United States. In 1960, he joined a group of former Castro aides in issuing a joint 3500-word manifesto calling for the overthrow of the Cuban leader. He found employment teaching Spanish at a school in New York City. After 20 years of living in U.S., Chibás moved to Caracas to join two of his children. In 1991, having spent 10 years in Venezuela, he moved to Miami, where he spent the rest of his life.
