= Orders, decorations, and medals of Cuba =

The orders, decorations, and medals of Cuba are orders and medals awarded for exemplary service to the nation of Cuba. The current decoration system has 2 honorary titles, 22 orders, 49 medals, and 35 distinctions.

== Honorary titles ==
Award	Name (English/Spanish)	Date of creation	Award criteria
	Hero of the Republic of Cuba; Héroe de la República de Cuba	10 December 1979	"Awarded to members of the Armed Forces and to any Cuban citizen or from friendly countries, for extraordinary merits and feats carried out in the defense of the homeland and the conquests of the Revolution or for exceptional contributions to the cause of socialism and in the struggle against imperialism."
	Hero of Labour of the Republic of Cuba; Héroe del Trabajo de la República de Cuba	10 December 1979	"Awarded to Cuban and foreign citizens in recognition of extraordinary merits achieved in productive labour or in struggles for conquests and in defense of the achievements and interests of the working class, as well as for consistent practice and valuable contributions to proletarian internationalism."

== Orders ==
Award	Name (English/Spanish)	Date of creation	Award criteria
	Order of Carlos Manuel de Céspedes; Orden Carlos Manuel de Céspedes	18 April 1926	
	Order of Carlos J. Finlay; Orden Carlos J. Finlay	21 January 1928 (established); 10 December 1979 (ratified)	"Awarded to Cuban and foreign citizens in recognition of extraordinary merits and valuable contributions to the development of natural or social sciences, scientific or research activities that have contributed exceptionally to the progress of science and for the benefit of humanity, and especially to the preservation and improvement of the health and welfare of the people."
(First class) (Second class)	Order of Felix Varela; Orden Felix Varela	10 December 1979	"awarded to Cuban and foreign citizens and cultural groups, in recognition of extraordinary contributions made in favor of the enduring values of national and universal culture."
	Order of May 17th Orden 17 de Mayo	24 May 1989	"awarded to Cuban and foreign citizens who have extraordinary merits achieved through important contributions with their efforts to the national economy in the agricultural sector and who have maintained an outstanding work career and an exemplary and consistent attitude with the Revolution."
(First class) (Second class) (Third class)	Order of Lazaro Pena; Orden Lazaro Pena	10 December 1979	"awarded to Cuban and foreign workers for extraordinary work merits, for important contributions made to the national economy or for a correct and sustained attitude towards work, whether in industry, agriculture, services, administration, construction, transportation, sciences, arts, culture or technology."
	Order of Antonio Maceo; Orden Antonio Maceo	10 December 1979	"awarded to members of the Revolutionary Armed Forces in active, reserve and retired military service, to military units of the Revolutionary Armed Forces, for extraordinary merits in military operations; for high combative qualities, or for the training and preparation of its command staff who have contributed to the defense, development and consolidation of our socialist homeland. It will also be awarded to soldiers and military units of friendly countries for similar reasons."
(First class) (Second class) (Third class)	Order of Ernesto Che Guevara; Orden Ernesto Che Guevara	10 December 1979	"awarded in one of its degrees to members of the Revolutionary Armed Forces in active military service, in reserve and in retirement, who have acquired extraordinary merits in fulfilling internationalist missions for the sake of the independence and sovereignty of the peoples who fight against imperialism, colonialism, neocolonialism and any other form of exploitation. Exceptionally, it can also be awarded to other Cuban citizens and soldiers from friendly countries, who in a show of internationalist solidarity have carried out missions of that nature in an exemplary manner."
	Order for Sports Merit; Orden al Mérito Deportivo	10 December 1979	"awarded to Cuban and foreign citizens, in recognition of extraordinary merits achieved in sports or for a relevant and selfless contribution to the development of physical culture and sports. It will also be awarded to technicians, specialists, and entities and organizations, Cuban and foreign, that have contributed in an extraordinary way to the development of physical culture, sports or the improvement of our athletes. It can be awarded posthumously."
	Order of Frank País; Orden Frank País	10 December 1979 (established) 27 March 1982 (modified)	"awarded to Cuban and foreign citizens, in recognition of extraordinary merits acquired in education, or who have contributed in a relevant and selfless manner to the comprehensive and educational training of citizens, or who have made valuable contributions to the development of education."
(First class) (Second class)	Order of the Liberation War Fighter; Orden Combatiente de la Guerra de Liberación		"awarded to combatants of fronts, columns or units of the Rebel Army. In exceptional cases it may be awarded to other people who have participated prominently in the insurrectionary struggle. They must have maintained an exemplary attitude consistent with revolutionary principles."
	Order for Service to the Homeland in the Revolutionary Armed Forces; Orden Por el Servicio a la Patria en las Fuerzas Armadas Revolucionarias	13 July 1988	"awarded to members of the Revolutionary Armed Forces in active military service for extraordinary merits acquired during the performance of military service in defense of the socialist homeland and its territorial integrity."
	Order of Playa Girón; Orden Playa Girón	18 July 1961 (established) 10 December 1979 (ratified)	"awarded to Cuban and foreign citizens and Heads of State or Government who stand out extraordinarily in the fight against imperialism, colonialism, neocolonialism, racism, fascism and any other form of exploitation; for valuable contributions to the development of the armed forces and their defensive capacity; for great feats in favor of peace and the progress of humanity, as well as for the defense of our Homeland and the conquests of the Revolution."
(First class) (Second class)	Order of Maximo Gomez; Orden Maximo Gomez	10 December 1979	"awarded to members of the Revolutionary Armed Forces in active, reserve and retired military service, and to civilian citizens, for extraordinary merits in the defense of our socialist homeland; for standing out in the direction of large military operations or for having brilliantly directed the fronts or columns of the Rebel Army during the National Liberation War."
(First class) (Second class)	Order of June 6 Orden 6 de Junio	13 July 1988	"awarded to active or retired members of the Ministry of the Interior and to units of the Ministry of the Interior for extraordinary merits in the fulfillment of the missions entrusted to them and very relevant successes in the development of their work that have contributed to the maintenance of the state security or internal order."
	Order of José Martí; Orden José Martí	2 December 1972 (established) 10 December 1979 (ratified)	"awarded to Cuban and foreign citizens and Heads of State or Government for great feats in favor of peace and humanity; for valuable and extraordinary contributions in education, culture, science and sports, as well as for extraordinary merits and outstanding attitudes in creative work."
	Order of Cienfuegos; Orden Cienfuegos	10 December 1979	
	Order of Ana Betancourt; Orden Ana Betancourt	28 November 1974 (established) 10 December 1979 (ratified)	Awarded to women who "demonstrate revolutionary and internationalist merit and anti-imperialist fidelity and/or great merit in a field of work that contributes to the national interest." Originally this was the highest award of the Federation of Cuban Women.

== Medals ==
=== Civil medals ===
Award	Name (English/Spanish)	Date of creation	Award criteria
	Medal of Friendship; Medalla de la Amistad		

=== Military medals ===
Award	Name (English/Spanish)	Date of creation	Award criteria
	50th Anniversary Commemorative Medal of 26 July; Medalla Conmemorativa 50 Aniversario del 26 de Julio	2003	
	20th Anniversary Commemorative Medal of the Revolutionary Armed Forces; Medalla Conmemorativa XX Aniversario de las Fuerzas Armadas Revolucionarias	23 November 1976	

== Historical (Pre 1959) ==
=== National orders ===
Award	Name (English/Spanish)	Date of creation	Last awarded
Military Orders
Various	Order of Military Merit; Orden Mérito Militar	Presidential decree No.196 of 27 February 1912	
	Order of Naval Merit; Orden Mérito Naval	Presidential decree No.196 of 27 February 1912	
	Order of Police Merit; Orden Mérito Policia	Presidential decree No.1283 of 7 May 1936	
	Order of Merit Mambi; Orden Mérito Mambí	Presidential decree No.4049 of 8 December 1955	
Civil Orders
	Order of Honor & Merit of the Red Cross; Orden de Honor y Mérito de la Cruz Roja Cubana	Presidential decree No.72 of 31 January 1913	
	National Order of Merit Carlos Manuel de Cespedes; Orden nacional de mérito Carlos Manuel de Céspedes	Presidential decree No.486 of 18 April 1926	
	Order of Carlos J. Finlay; Orden Carlos J. Finlay	Presidential decree No.77 of 21 January 1928	
	Order of Jose Maria Heredia Merit; Orden de Mérito Intelectual José María Heredia	Presidential decree No.364 of 8 February 1941	
	Order of Commercial Merit; Orden de Mérito Comercial	Presidential decree No.2217 of 25 June 1943	
	Order of Agriculture and Industrial Merit; Orden de Mérito Agrícola e Industrial	Presidential decree No.81 of 20 January 1944	
	Order of Jose Lanuza; Orden de Jose Lanuza	Presidential decree No.174 of 1 February 1944	
	Order of Mariana Grajales; Orden Nacional De Honor y Merito Mariana Grajales	Presidential decree No.4066 of 3 November 1952	
	Order of Road Construction Merit; Orden de Mérito Vial	Presidential decree No.1294 of 11 May 1956	

=== Military medals ===
Award	Name (English/Spanish)	Date of creation	Award criteria
	Cuban Liberator Medal; Medalla de la Liberator	Presidential decree No.... of ...	
	Cuban Independence Medal; Medalla de la Independencia	Presidential decree No.129 of 24 February 1911	
	Medal of Emigration; Medalla de la Emigración	Presidential decree No.918 of 10 October 1913	
	Medal of the Veterans of the Spanish American War; Medalla a los Veteranos de la Guerra Hispano-Americana	Presidential decree No.... of ... 1915	
	Inter-Allied Victory Medal; Medalla de la Victoria	10 June 1922	
	Military Subordination Cross; Cruz a la Jerarquia Militar	Presidential decree No.318 of 18 January 1937	
	Distinguished Service Medal of the Cuban Red Cross "Henry Dunant"; Medalla se servicios distinguidos de la Cruz Roja Cubana "Henry Dunant"	Presidential decree No.2243 of 10 August 1953	
	Maceo Cross; Cruz del Maceo	Presidential decree No.3063 of 23 November 1953	
	Distinguished Service Medal; Medalla de servicio distinguido	Presidential decree No.... of ...	
	Armed Forces Long Service Medal; Medalla de las Fuerzas Armadas por Servicio Largo	Presidential decree No.... of ...	
	Armed Forces Merit Medal; Medalla al Mérito de las Fuerzas Armadas	Presidential decree No... of ...	
	National Reconciliation Medal; Medalla de la Reconciliación Nacional	Presidential decree No... of ...	

== See also ==
- Socialist orders of merit
