= Bourgeois nationalism =

Nationalism of the ruling class under capitalism

In Marxist theory, bourgeois nationalism is the ideology of the ruling capitalist class which aims to overcome class antagonism between proletariat and bourgeoisie by appealing to national unity. It is seen as a distraction from engaging in class struggle and an attempt to impose interests of capitalists on the proletariat by constructing capitalist interests as "national interests". Internationally, it aims to create antagonism between workers of different nations and serves as a divide-and-conquer strategy. The bourgeois nationalism is contrasted with left-wing nationalism and proletarian internationalism.

== Usage ==
=== Soviet Union ===
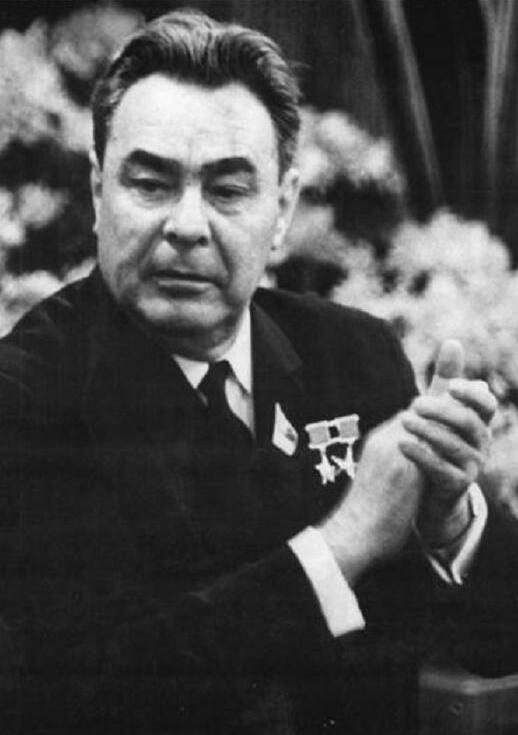
Leonid Brezhnev

After the October Revolution, the Bolshevik government based its nationalities policy (korenization) on the principles of Marxism. According to these principles, all nations should disappear with time, and nationalism was considered a bourgeois ideology. By the mid-1930s these policies were replaced with more extreme assimilationist and Russification policies. The term was used indiscriminately to smear national groups opposed to Russian centralism.

In his Report on the 50th anniversary of the formation of the USSR, General Secretary Leonid Brezhnev emphasized: "That is why Communists and all fighters for socialism believe that the main aspect of the national question is unification of the working people, regardless of their national origin, in the common battle against every type of oppression, and for a new social system which rules out exploitation of the working people."

In the Soviet Union throughout its existence, the term generally referred to Ukrainian, Estonian, Latvian, Armenian, Kazakh and other types of nationalism that were propagated by the Soviet Union's non-Russian minorities. The Soviet leadership saw their struggle for independence as a threat to the entire existence of the USSR's communist regime.

=== China ===
Bourgeois nationalism as a concept was discussed by China's president, Liu Shaoqi as follows:

The exploitation of wage labour, competition, the squeezing out, suppressing and swallowing of rivals among the capitalists themselves, the resorting to war and even world war, the utilisation of all means to secure a monopoly position in its own country and throughout the world - such is the inherent character of the profit-seeking bourgeoisie. This is the class basis of bourgeois nationalism and of all bourgeois ideologies. [...] The most vicious manifestations of the development of bourgeois nationalism include the enslavement of the colonial and semi-colonial countries by the imperialist powers, the First World War, the aggression of Hitler and Mussolini and the Japanese warlords during the Second World War, and the schemes for the enslavement of the whole world undertaken by the international imperialist camp, headed by American imperialism.

=== Judaism and Zionism ===
In 1949, the Communist Party USA declared the Zionist movement to be a form of "Jewish bourgeois nationalism".

Writing for People's World in 2003, the leftist activist John Gilman referred to Jewish bourgeoisie nationalism as having multiple varieties, including Jewish assimilationism and Zionism.

== See also ==
- Civic nationalism
- Class collaboration
- National liberalism
- Social patriotism
- Socialist patriotism
- Sovietization
