= Lalo Sardiñas =

Eduardo "Lalo" Sardiñas was a combatant of the Cuban Revolution, and a member of the 26th of July Movement, led by Fidel Castro during 1958 and 1959.

== Biography ==
Eduardo "Lalo" Sardiñas was a merchant who worked in the Sierra Maestra area in the 1950s. In 1957 Sardiñas joined Fidel Castro's newly established guerrilla group after killing a stranger who had entered his home.

When the Second Column (the so-called Fourth Column) was created under the command of Che Guevara, he appointed Lalo as his second in command, with the rank of captain. In various fights and skirmishes he demonstrated courage and intelligence.

In September 1957, Sardiñas decided to punish one of his men for a breach of discipline. He tried to hit him in the head with his pistol, but accidentally shot and killed the man. The event produced a general reaction from the guerrillas demanding that Sardiñas be shot. Che Guevara and Fidel Castro held a different opinion than that of the majority of the rebel army. They tried for a whole day to convince their men that shooting Sardiñas was an excessive punishment. Finally, a conflictive vote was held among all the members of the rebel army in which for a small difference, it was decided to downgrade but not shoot. Seventy-six guerrillas voted for degradation of the punishment, while seventy voted for death.

As a result of the trial, Lalo Sardiñas lost his position and was replaced by Camilo Cienfuegos as Second Commander of Che Guevara in the Fourth Column. Later, in June 1958, Lalo Sardiñas, now with the rank of lieutenant and in command of a twenty-three-man battalion, played a key role in stopping the government's military offensive on the guerrilla positions in Sierra Maestra; a fact that would later enable the counteroffensive that would finally lead to the fall of the dictator Fulgencio Batista.

A few weeks later, when the guerrillas decided to go down and begin the march on Santa Clara, Sardiñas was promoted to commander and was placed in command of Column No. 12 Simón Bolívar. In that role he was responsible for preventing government troops from surrounding the columns of Camilo Cienfuegos and Che Guevara advancing towards the Escambray on the border between Camagüey and Oriente.

Finally, the day before Batista's escape, on December 30, 1958, Sardiñas and his men took the city of Jobabo for good.

== See also ==
- Cuban Revolution
