= Ruby Hart Phillips =

Ruby Hart Phillips (December 12, 1898 – October 28, 1985) was a New York Times correspondent in Cuba who covered the Batista regime and the rise of Fidel Castro. She reported from the island for 24 years, from 1937 to 1961. Her coverage, relatively favorable toward Batista, was often at odds with that of Herbert Matthews, the noted Times foreign correspondent who favored Castro. Personal animosity grew between them, and their contradictory coverage of the same events drew criticism from readers and media critics. Life became increasingly difficult for Phillips after the Cuban Revolution because of her anti-Castro temperament. She left Cuba for good in 1961, shortly after her home and office were raided and her Cuban colleagues were arrested. She died in Cocoa Beach, Florida at the age of 86.

== Biography ==
Ruby Hart was born to John Hart, a cattle merchant, in 1900 in Oklahoma. As a young woman, she moved around Oklahoma, Texas, and New Mexico, and enrolled in half a dozen schools. Eventually she learned basic secretarial skills in a Dallas business school, then held a series of miscellaneous jobs. She decided to leave the Southwest and moved to Cuba, where she took a job at Westinghouse Electric.

In Havana she met and married James Doyle Phillips, another American expatriate. Phillips learned journalism from James, who began contributing to the New York Times in 1931. After James was killed in a stateside car accident in 1937, the Times allowed Phillips to take over as foreign correspondent in Cuba, despite the fact she had virtually no journalistic experience. Phillips used the byline "R. Hart Phillips" to disguise that she was a woman, since female foreign correspondents were highly unusual at the time. She wrote several books about Cuba.

== Cuban Revolution ==
Phillips had been reporting from Cuba for 20 years when Fidel Castro rose to power. Fellow foreign correspondent and Times editorialist Herbert Matthews believed Phillips "did not measure up to the standards of the Times" and her reports could not be trusted because of her close relationships with the officials in Batista's regime. The two clashed professionally and personally, and the conflict was evident in their reporting. Editors at the Times attempted to mediate the feud, though they felt that Phillips was too anti-Castro and Matthews too pro-Castro.

== Bibliography ==
- Phillips, R Hart (1935). Cuban side show. Cuban Press, Havana 2nd edition. ASIN: B000860P60
- Phillips, R Hart. (1959). Cuba, Island of Paradox. McDowell, Obolensky, New York, NY ASIN: B0007E0OAU
- Phillips, R Hart. (1960). Cuba Island of Paradise 1960. Astor-Honor Inc, ISBN 0-8392-5012-6
- Phillips, R Hart. (1962). The Cuban Dilemma. McDowell, Obolensky, New York, NY. Library of Congress number 6218787
