= John J. Gilman =

American materials scientist (1925–2009)

John Joseph "Jack" Gilman (December 22, 1925 – September 10, 2009) was an American material scientist in the field of mechanical properties of solids. He made major contributions to many areas of the field including dislocation behavior of ceramics, disclination behavior of polymers, and production of metal glasses.

== Life ==
John J. Gilman was born in Green Bay, Wisconsin. In 1946, he received both his Bachelor of Science in mechanical engineering and his Master of Science from the Illinois Institute of Technology. In 1952, Gilman received PhD in physical metallurgy from Columbia University. In 1952, he briefly worked at the Crucible Steel Company of America as a steel researcher and subsequently worked at the General Electric Research Laboratory that same year. While working at the General Electric laboratory, he expanded his studies in mechanical properties and the structure of single crystals.

After leaving General Electric in 1960, Gilman became a professor of engineering at Brown University. He moved to University of Illinois as a professor of physics and metallurgy in 1963. In 1968, he became director of the Materials Research Center at Allied Chemical. At Allied, he worked on metallic glasses. In 1978, he became director of the Corporate Development Center. In 1980, he became a research manager at Standard Oil. In 1981, he became a director of Amoco Battery Technology. In 1985, he became a director of the Center for Advanced Materials at Lawrence Berkeley National Laboratory at the University of California, Berkeley. In 1987, he became a senior scientist studying the crystalline structure and mechanical properties of solids. In 1993, he became an adjunct professor at the University of California, Los Angeles.

== Discoveries ==
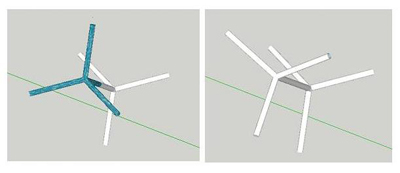
Tetrahedral support structures: left, Gilman's tetrahedral truss; right, Weaire–Phelan structure

In all, 330 scientific papers were published under his name on topics including metals, ceramics, glasses, semiconductors, polymers, diamond and nano-materials. Gilman was editor and co-editor of three books and author of four. His work also resulted in him acquiring several patents including one for rhenium boride compounds to be used as abrasives, cutting tools and as protective coatings. Gilman is known for his contributions to the field of material science (dislocations in ceramics, disclinations in polymers, and new metal glasses).

Gilman designed a tetrahedral truss different from Buckminster Fuller's famous 1953 truss in 1981. Gilman attributed the strength of his tetrahedral truss to "the inherent rigidity of the skeletal triangle" and "the rigidity of the basic tetrahedron".

== Honors ==
For his contributions to material science and research management in industry Professor Gilman received honors and recognitions worldwide.
