= Rufo López-Fresquet =

Cuban economist and Minister of Finance (1911–1983)

Rufo López Fresquet (1911 – 2 August 1983) was a Cuban economist serving as the Cuban Minister of the Treasury from 1959 to 1960.

Following the "triumph" of the Cuban Revolution on January 1, 1959, López served as Minister of the Treasury under President Manuel Urrutia Lleó and Prime Minister José Miró Cardona. Fourteen months later, on March 17, 1960, López resigned from his post as minister. Following his involvement in the failed coup d'état of August 30, 1962, he fled to the United States with his American wife Helen Bigger.

In 1966 he wrote a book, My 14 Months with Castro, that attempted to shed light on the origins of the Cuban revolution and the reasons behind Castro's new government becoming communist.

As Minister of the Treasury, López made concerted efforts to work with American companies, hoping to gain the interest of foreign investors. According to one source, "Cuban Minister of Finances Rufo Lopez Fresquet told Bohemia magazine, 'I met more than 220 presidents of US corporations... Eastern, Pan American, Pepsi-Cola, Sinclair, Remington Rand, National Can and many other US corporations [were] interested in Cuba."

In 2005, Rufo Lopez-Fresquet was portrayed in the movie The Lost City by actor Carlos Menendez.

López had three sons, Antonio, Victor, and Miguel, and died in 1983 in Stockton, California. He was a professor of economics at the University of the Pacific.
