= John Gilman (activist) =

War hero and social activist

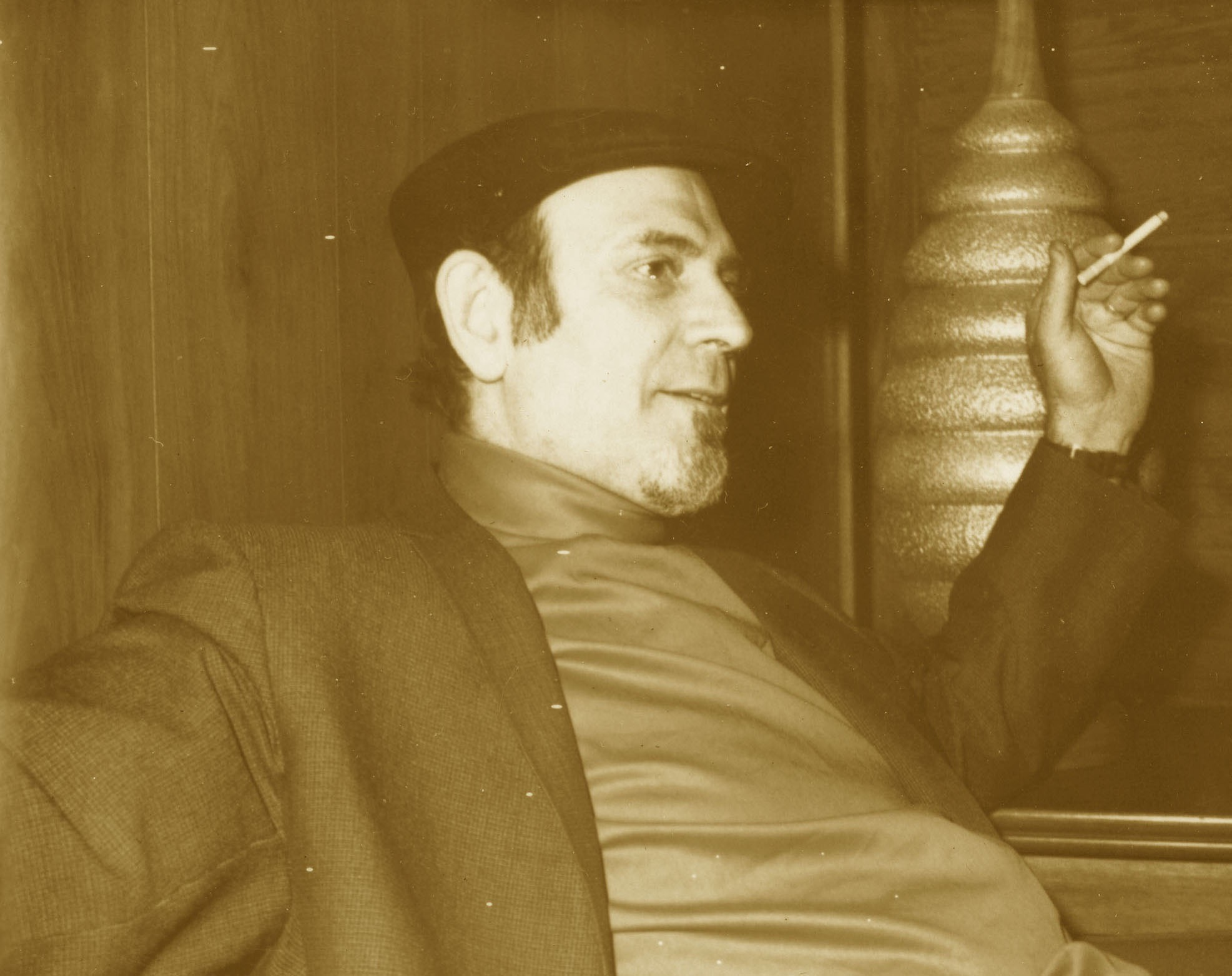
John Gilman

John Gilman (September 16, 1920 – April 26, 2011) was an American activist and World War II veteran. He first became involved in unionism and left-wing politics in high school in the 1930s. In 1956 he was subpoenaed to testify before the House Un-American Activities Committee. He later campaigned for civil rights and desegregation in Milwaukee, which resulted in the 1966 firebombing of his flooring business by the Grand Dragon of the Illinois Ku Klux Klan. Gilman advocated for improved ties to Cuba and promoted freedom for the Cuban Five. He was also a leader of the Milwaukee Coalition for Peace and Justice and a board member of the Wisconsin Action Coalition.

== War Service ==
John Gilman was drafted during World War II at the age of 22. After training as a tank gunner he shipped to England and took part in the second wave of the Normandy D-Day invasion, arriving at Utah Beach on June 10, 1944 with the 9th Infantry Division. He first saw combat at St. Lo in France, and later the Battle of Huertgen Forest. During the invasion of Germany, Gilman destroyed a German tank single-handed, for which he was awarded the Distinguished Service Cross. Gilman was also with the unit that linked up with the Soviet Army at the Elbe River in 1945.

== Early political activities ==
Gilman was a candidate for the Wisconsin Senate in 1948 and 1949 representing the People's Progressive Party and also served as the executive secretary of the Wisconsin Civil Rights Congress. The latter organization was labeled a communist front by then U.S. attorney general Tom C. Clark. Gilman was accused of being a member of the National Committee to Secure Justice for the Rosenbergs and Morton Sobell, which he denied. He was subpoenaed to appear before the House Un-American Activities Committee (HUAC) in 1956 where he was asked if he had ever been a member of the Communist Party. He declined to answer, asserting his 5th amendment rights. After he was dismissed, he told the HUAC subcommittee that he wanted to donate his $6 witness fee to the Civil Rights Congress.

== Ku Klux Klan bombing ==
On July 1, 1966 a pipe bomb exploded at the Allied Linoleum store owned by John Gilman. This was followed several hours later by an explosion at the Milwaukee NAACP headquarters. A month before the explosion Gilman reported that he had found a crushed baby mouse in an envelope placed into the mail slot of his home. After the bombings, the FBI traced the pipe bombs to Robert C. Schmidt and Turner Cheney. Cheney, who was the Grand Dragon of the Illinois Ku Klux Klan, was sentenced to 15 years in prison.

== External references ==
- Footsoldier for Peace and Justice - The story of John Gilman
