= Socialist orders of merit =

Merits in socialist countries

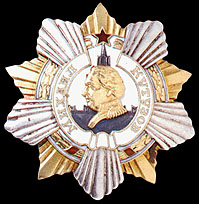
A small star of Order of Kutuzov

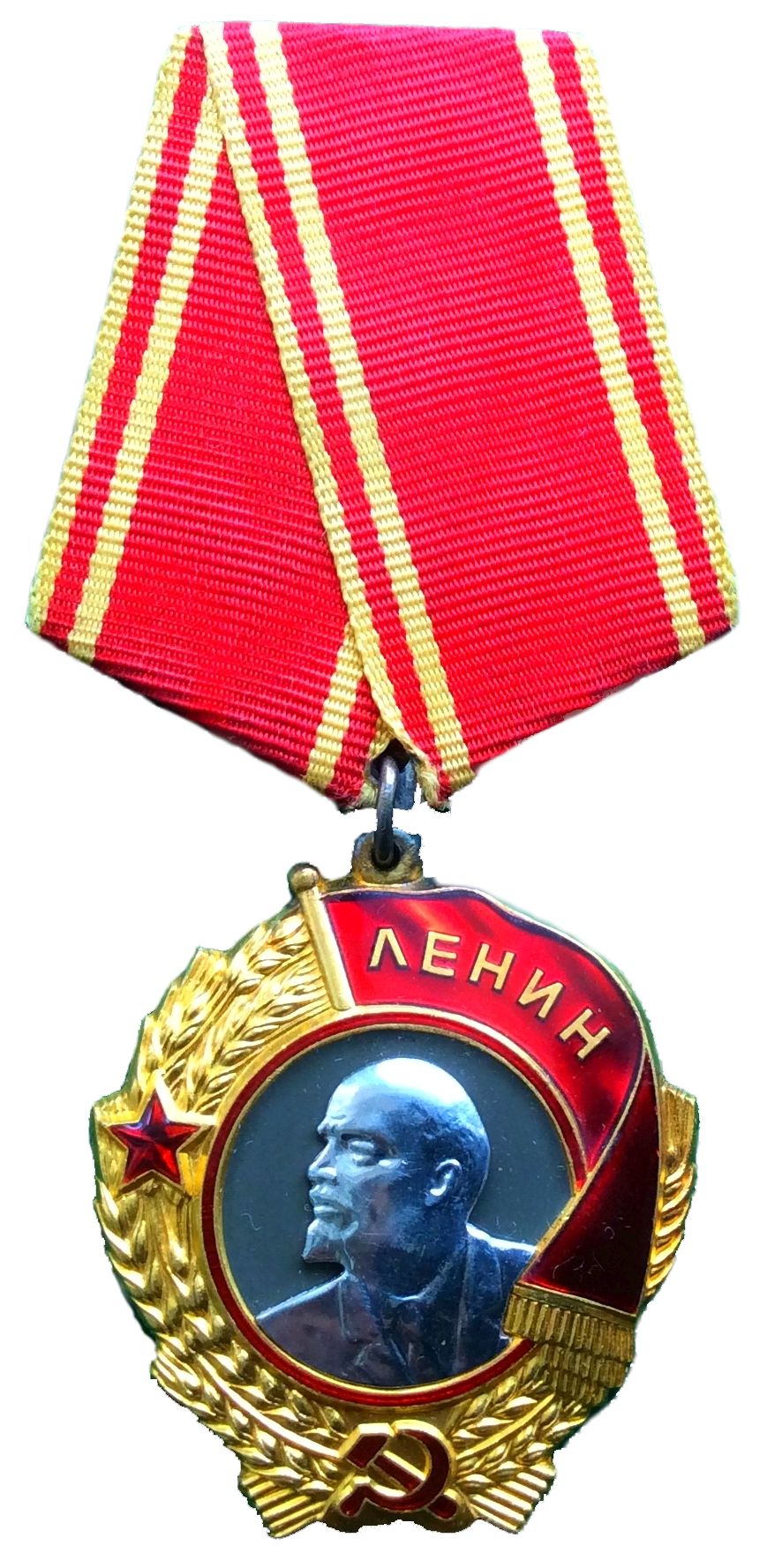
Order of Lenin

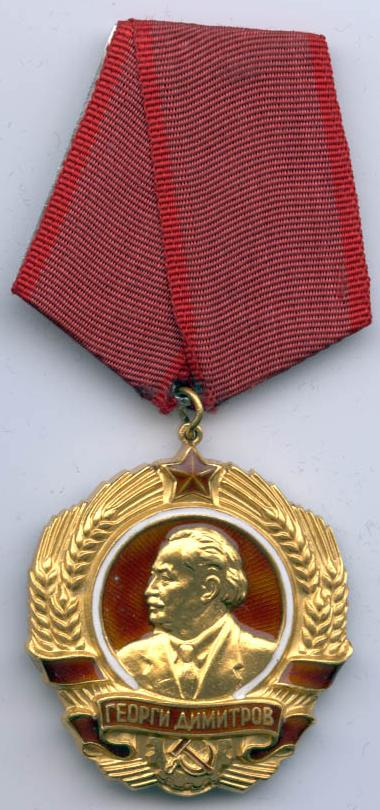
Order of Georgi Dimitrov (People's Republic of Bulgaria)

After the October Revolution, in which the Bolsheviks seized power in Russia, the first Socialist Orders of Merit were founded. After World War II, communists came to power in many other countries and this type of order spread all over the world. In many new African nations this type of decoration was instituted, probably because they were so different from the Orders of Knighthood of the former colonial masters.

Having abolished the orders of the Czar, the first order of the Soviet Union, called the "Order of the Red Banner", was founded on 16 September 1918, the "Order of the Red Banner of Labour" for civil merits 15 months later. In the Stalinist USSR, several more military and civil orders were created, including the revival of some abolished czarist orders, and a few more were added in the 1970s.

Yugoslavia always chose to follow its own policy in creating decorations. Poland and Czechoslovakia stuck to elements of the traditional orders like grand-crosses, commanders and knights but countries like Angola, Afghanistan and North Korea copied all the models and names of Soviet decorations.

After the collapse of the Soviet Union, the Russian Federation, the newly independent former Soviet republics, and many of the former socialist nations of eastern Europe established their own state orders, some of which are a continuance, revival, or model of orders pre-dating the Communist era.

== See also ==
- Orders of the Soviet Union
- Orders of Soviet Republics
- Orders of the People's Republic of Bulgaria
- Orders of China
- Orders of Cuba
- Orders of East Germany
- Orders of North Korea
- Orders of Vietnam
- Orders of the Socialist Federal Republic of Yugoslavia
- Order of merit

== Literature ==
- Václav Měřička, The book of orders and decorations, London: Hamlyn 1975. ISBN 0600367312
- Paul Hieronymussen, Europaeiske ordner i farver, Kopenhagen 1967
- Paul Hieronymussen, Orders, medals and decorations of Britain and Europe in colour London: Blandford Press, 1967.
