= Alfredo Abon Lee =

Cuban army officer (1927–2012)

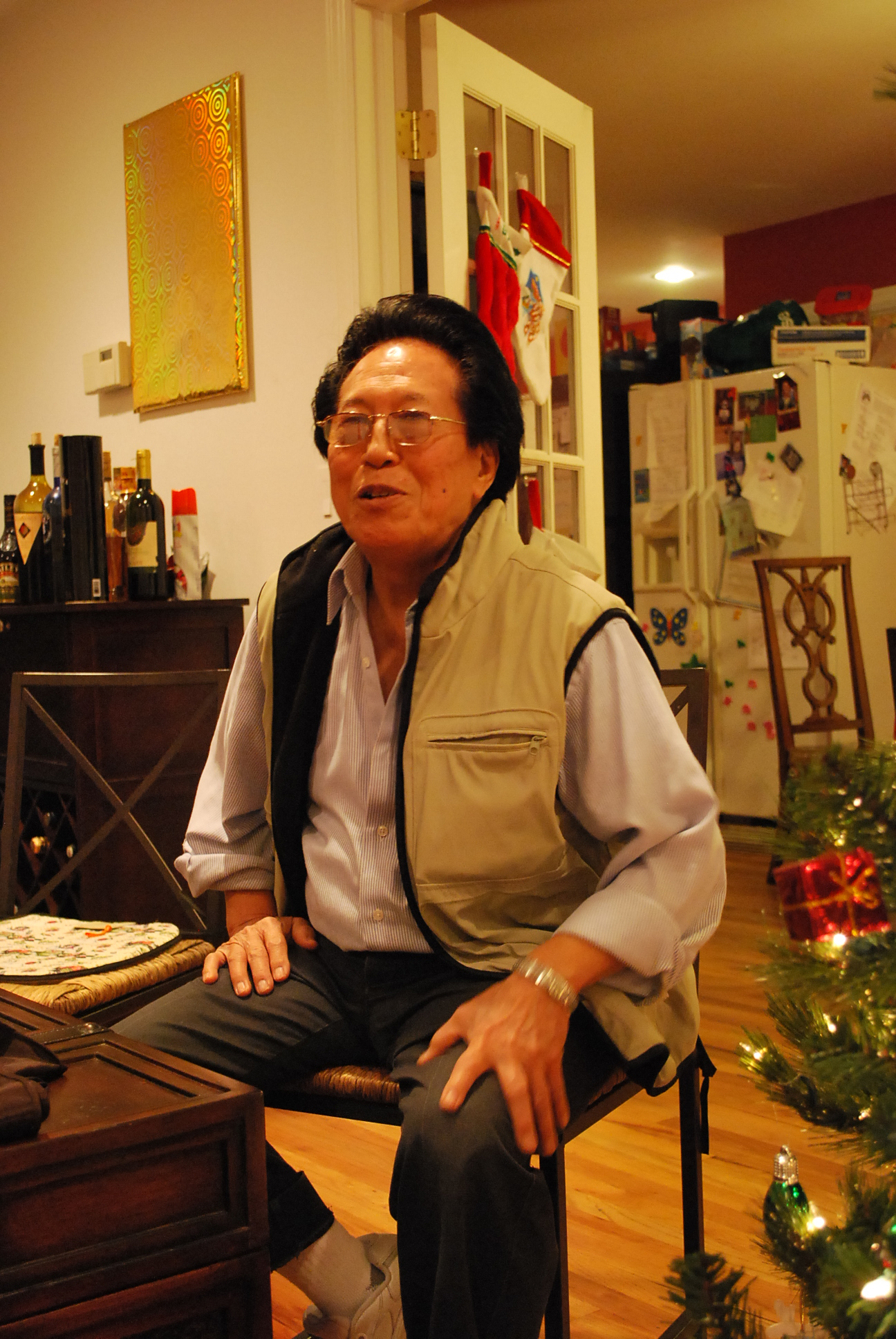
- Alfredo Abon Lee in 2008
- Born: 25 October 1927; Santa Clara, Las Villas, Republic of Cuba
- Died: 4 December 2012 (aged 85); Englewood, New Jersey, U.S.
- Allegiance: Republic of Cuba
- Service / branch: Cuban Constitutional Army
- Battles / wars: Cuban Revolution; Battle of Yaguajay

Captain Alfredo Abón Lee (October 25, 1927 – December 4, 2012) was a Cuban army officer of Chinese Cuban ancestry who was the commander of the garrison at Yaguajay Squadron and was sent to Las Villas, replacing Colonel Roger Rojas Lavernia, where he fought the 26th of July Movement in December 1958 in one of the final engagements of the Cuban Revolution. Before that, he served in the Battalion 22 during operations in Eastern Cuba.

He died on December 4, 2012, in Englewood, New Jersey, United States.
