= Pilar García (brigadier general) =

Cuban Brigadier general and Chief of the National Police

Pilar D. García (12 October 1896 – October 1960) was Brigadier General and Chief of the National Police in pre-revolutionary Cuba.

== Career ==
Pilar García was born in San José de las Lajas on 12 October 1896. In 1915 he became a soldier in the Cuban army. He retired in 1944 with the rank of captain. After the 1952 coup of Fulgencio Batista he re-entered active service with the rank of colonel. In 1955 García was appointed head of the Guardia Rural regiment in Matanzas. He repelled the attack on the Goicuria Barracks. After the incident he was accused of torture and execution of Julio Adán García Rodriguez. In March 1958 Garcia was appointed Chief of the National Police and one month later he was promoted to the rank of General. He became known for not taking prisoners.

== Personal life ==
He married Eloisa Baez and had two sons, Rolando Garcia Baez, a lieutenant colonel in the Cuban Military Aviation and Irenaldo Garcia Baez, also a lieutenant colonel as well as Chief of Military Intelligence (SIM). Garcia and his sons fought on the side of Fulgencio Batista during the Cuban Revolution.

Garcia along with his sons, their families and other military personnel, including General Francisco Tabernilla Dolz with family and Fulgencio Batista with family, left Cuba for the United States on New Year's Eve 1959, since the Cuban people were in support of Castro. He died in the United States in October 1960 of a heart attack.
