= Luis Martínez-Fernández =

American writer and historian

Luis Martínez-Fernández (born January 14, 1960) is a Cuban-born American historian, educator, and columnist, specializing in Cuban and Caribbean history and culture, education, and global contemporary history. He is Pegasus Professor of History at the University of Central Florida and was a weekly, nationally syndicated columnist with Creators Syndicate (2019–2023).

The focus of his books ranges widely across centuries from Key to the New World: A History of Early Colonial Cuba to Revolutionary Cuba: A History to contemporary US and World events. He served as chief editor of the multiple-award-winning Encyclopedia of Cuba: People, History Culture.

== Early life and education ==
Martínez-Fernández was born in Havana, Cuba in 1960, when the Cuban Revolution was entering its second year. In 1962, his family went into exile, settling briefly in Miami Beach then relocating to Lima Peru, until 1970, when his family moved to Puerto Rico. He attended the University of Puerto Rico (Río Piedras), where he studied under historians Fernando Picó and Andrés Ramos Mattei, earning B.A. and M.A. degrees in history. In 1986, Martínez-Fernández left Puerto Rico to attend Duke University, where he received a PhD in Latin American history (1990). His dissertation director was historian of colonial Latin America John TePaske.

== Career ==
Upon graduation from Duke, Martínez-Fernández joined the faculty of Augusta State University and later Colgate University, where he specialized in Caribbean and Latin American History. In 1994 he joined the Rutgers University faculty with a joint appointment in History and the Department of Puerto Rican and Hispanic Caribbean Studies, which he chaired between 1998 and 2004.

Since 2004, he has taught at the University of Central Florida, where he directed the Latin American Studies Program and founded the Latin American Cultural Festival of Central Florida. In 2021 he was awarded a Pegasus Professorship, UCF's highest academic honor.

Martínez-Fernández is also an award-winning columnist, whose op-eds have appeared in the Christian Science Monitor, The Miami Herald, and the Chronicle of Higher Education among other periodicals, and the online news venue The Globe Post. In 2020, he joined Creators Syndicate as weekly syndicated columnist.

== Recognition, awards, and publications ==
- International Latino Book Awards, Bronze Medal, Best books in Politics / Contemporary Affairs, 2024.
- National Society of Newspaper Columnists, Second place Award (online category), 2021.
- Pegasus Professorship, highest academic honor conferred to University of Central Florida faculty, 2021.
- Member of the Academia de la Historia de Cuba en el Exilio, inducted November 2020.
- International Latino Book Awards, Gold Medal, Best History Book, 2019.
- Florida Book Awards, Bronze Medal, General Nonfiction Category, 2018.
- University of Puerto Rico, Distinguished Alumnus Residing Abroad, 2002.

=== Selected bibliography ===
- Martínez-Fernández, Luis (2023). When the World Turned Upside Down: Politics, Culture, and the Unimaginable Events of 2019-2022. New York: Peter Lang Publishers. ISBN 9781433196140.
- Martínez-Fernández, Luis (2019). Key to the New World: A History of Early Colonial Cuba. Gainesville: University of Florida Press. ISBN 978-1-68340-032-5.
- Martínez-Fernández, Luis (2014). Revolutionary Cuba: A History. Gainesville: University of Florida Press. ISBN 978-0-8130-6201-3.
- Martínez-Fernández, Luis (2010). Frontiers, Plantations, and Walled Cities: Essays on Society, Culture, and Politics in the Hispanic Caribbean, 1800–1945. Princeton, NJ: Markus Wiener Publishers. ISBN 978-1-55876-511-5.
- Martínez-Fernández, Luis, ed. (2003). Encyclopedia of Cuba: People, History, Culture. Co-edited with Louis A. Pérez, Jr., D.H. Figueredo, and Luis González. Westport, CT: Greenwood Press. ISBN 978-1-57356-334-5.
- Martínez-Fernández, Luis (2002). Protestantism and Political Conflict in the Nineteenth-Century Hispanic Caribbean. New Brunswick, NJ: Rutgers University Press. ISBN 978-0-8135-2994-3.
- Martínez-Fernández, Luis (1998). Fighting Slavery in the Caribbean: The Life and Times of a British Family in Nineteenth-Century Havana. Armonk, NY: M.E. Sharpe Publishers. ISBN 978-0-7656-0248-0.
- Martínez-Fernández, Luis (1994). Torn between Empires: Economy, Society, and Patterns of Political Thought in the Hispanic Caribbean, 1840–1878. Athens: University of Georgia Press. ISBN 978-0-8203-5586-3.
