= Pico La Bayamesa National Park =

National park in Cuba

- Parque Nacional Pico La Bayamesa
- IUCN category II (national park)
- Interactive map of Pico La Bayamesa National Park
- Coordinates: 20°2′N 76°35′W
- Area: 242.1 km^{2} (93.5 sq mi)
- Designation: National Park
- Designated: 2012
- Administrator: Grupo Empresarial de Flora y la Fauna

Pico La Bayamesa National Park is a protected area in eastern Cuba. It is located in the Sierra Maestra in Granma and Santiago de Cuba provinces. The park was designated in 2012 and covers an area of 242.1 km^{2}. On the west it adjoins Turquino National Park.

The park is named for Pico La Bayamesa, the highest mountain in the park at 1754 meters.

Plant communities in the park include cloud forest, subpáramo (subalpine shrubland) and páramo (alpine grassland). Cuban and locally endemic plants include Cuban juniper (Juniperus saxicola), Sierra Maestra pine (Pinus maestrensis), Protium cubensis, Tabebuia shaferi, and Magnolia cubensis. 26 plant species are endemic to the Bayamesa-Turquino area and 100 are endemic to the Sierra Maestra.

Pico La Bayamesa and the adjoining Turquino National Park were together designated the Turquino - Bayamesa Important Bird Area (IBA). Approximately 80 species of resident and migratory birds have been recorded in the IBA.
