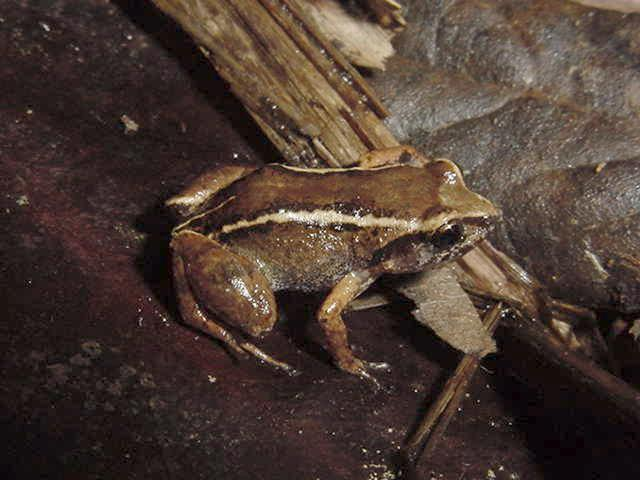

Conservation status
- Endangered (IUCN 3.1)

Scientific classification
- Kingdom: Animalia
- Phylum: Chordata
- Class: Amphibia
- Order: Anura
- Family: Eleutherodactylidae
- Genus: Eleutherodactylus
- Species: E. intermedius

Binomial name
- Eleutherodactylus intermedius Barbour & Shreve, 1937

= Eleutherodactylus intermedius =

Species of amphibian

Eleutherodactylus intermedius is a species of frog in the family Eleutherodactylidae endemic to eastern Cuba where it is known from the Sierra Maestra and Sierra del Cobre. Its common name is Pico Turquino robber frog, in reference to its type locality.

== Description ==
Eleutherodactylus intermedius are small frogs, with males growing to 17 mm (0.67 in) and females to 20 mm (0.79 in) snout–vent length. Colour varies from light gray to very dark brown, with various marbling or mottling. Some individuals have narrow, whitish dorsolateral streaks or a narrow, whitish mid-dorsal line. The digits are small and without digital discs. Toes have no webbing.

== Habitat and conservation ==
The species' natural habitat is moist closed forest. They are active at night, hiding under rocks, logs and other objects during the day.

E. intermedius is uncommon even in suitable habitat. It is threatened by habitat loss, even with the Turquino and La Bayamesa National Parks where it occurs.
