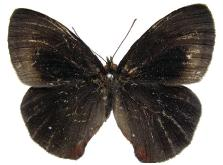
- Male, upperside
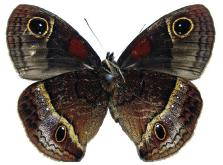
- Male, underside

Scientific classification
- Kingdom: Animalia
- Phylum: Arthropoda
- Class: Insecta
- Order: Lepidoptera
- Family: Nymphalidae
- Genus: Calisto
- Species: C. smintheus

Binomial name
- Calisto smintheus Bates, 1935

Synonyms
- Calisto delos Bates, 1935; Calisto smintheus smintheus Bates, 1939; Calisto smintheus delos Torre, 1968; Calisto biocellatus Torre, 1968; Calisto sibylla smintheus Brown and Heineman, 1972; Calisto sibylla delos Brown and Heineman, 1972

= Calisto smintheus =

Species of butterfly

Calisto israeli is a butterfly of the family Nymphalidae. It is endemic to Cuba, where it is known from the Sierra Maestra. The species inhabits evergreen and rainforests at altitudes between 800 and 1,500 metres. It is also found in cloud forest above 1,500 metres, and at the cloud scrub around Pico Turquino.

The length of the forewings is 19–25 mm. Adults have been observed feeding on flowers of Bourreria laevis, Palicourea alpina, Pavonia fruticosa, Mikania micrantha and Stachyterpheta cayenensis.

The larvae feed on Ichnanthus mayarensis. They eat the entire shell after hatching and feed at night remaining inactive during the day in lower parts of the plant.

== Gallery ==
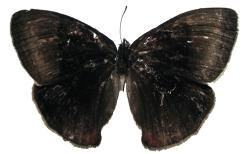
Female, upperside

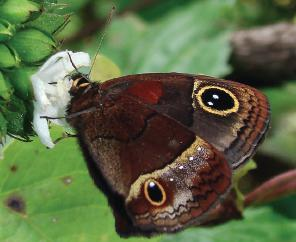

First instar larva

Second instar larva

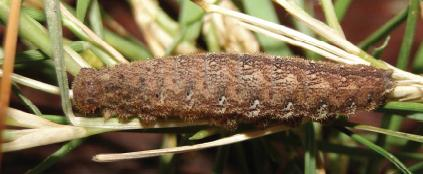
Fifth instar, lateral view

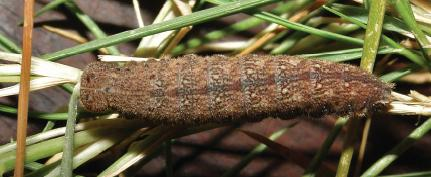
Fifth instar, dorsal view

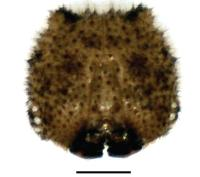
Fifth instar, head capsule

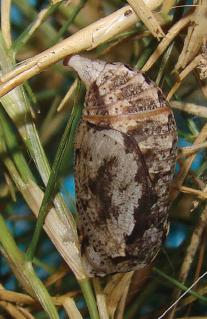
Pupa, lateral view

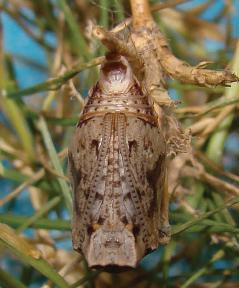
Pupa, ventral view

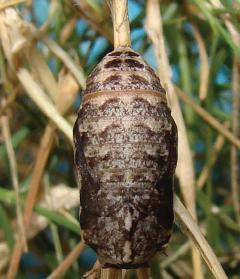
Pupa, dorsal view
