= Turquino National Park =

National park in Cuba

Turquino National Park Parque Nacional Turquino
- IUCN category II (national park)
- Location within Cuba
- Location: Santiago de Cuba Province, Cuba
- Nearest city: Guamá
- Coordinates: 19°59′22″N 76°50′9″W
- Area: 229.38 km^{2} (88.56 sq mi)
- Established: January 8, 1980

Turquino National Park, also called Sierra Maestra National Park, is a national park located in the Sierra Maestra mountain range in southeastern Cuba. It was established on 8 January 1980 with the passing of Bill 27/1980. It is named after Pico Turquino, the highest point in Cuba.

== Geography ==
The park is located in the Sierra Maestra mountain range about 50 kilometres (31 mi) west of Guamá in Santiago de Cuba Province. It encompasses a total area of 229.38 square kilometres (88.56 sq mi).

Among the mountains within the park are Pico Turbino, the highest point in Cuba at 1,975 metres (6,480 ft), Pico Cuba, Pico Real, and Pico Suecia. There are also numerous waterfalls and rivers, including the Río Turquino, as well as Marea del Portillo beach on Cuba's southeastern coast.

== Flora and fauna ==
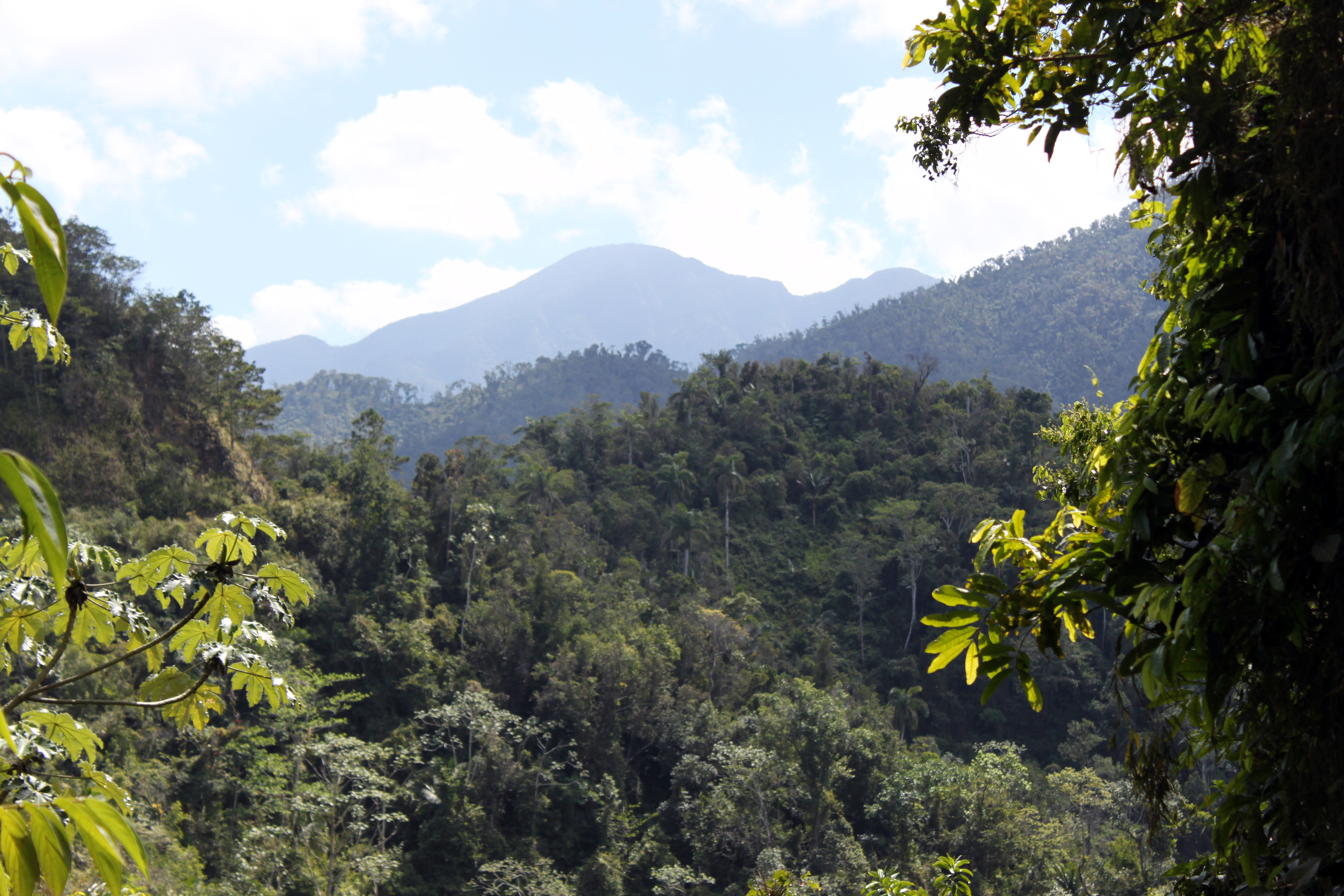
Cuban moist forests in Turquino National Park.

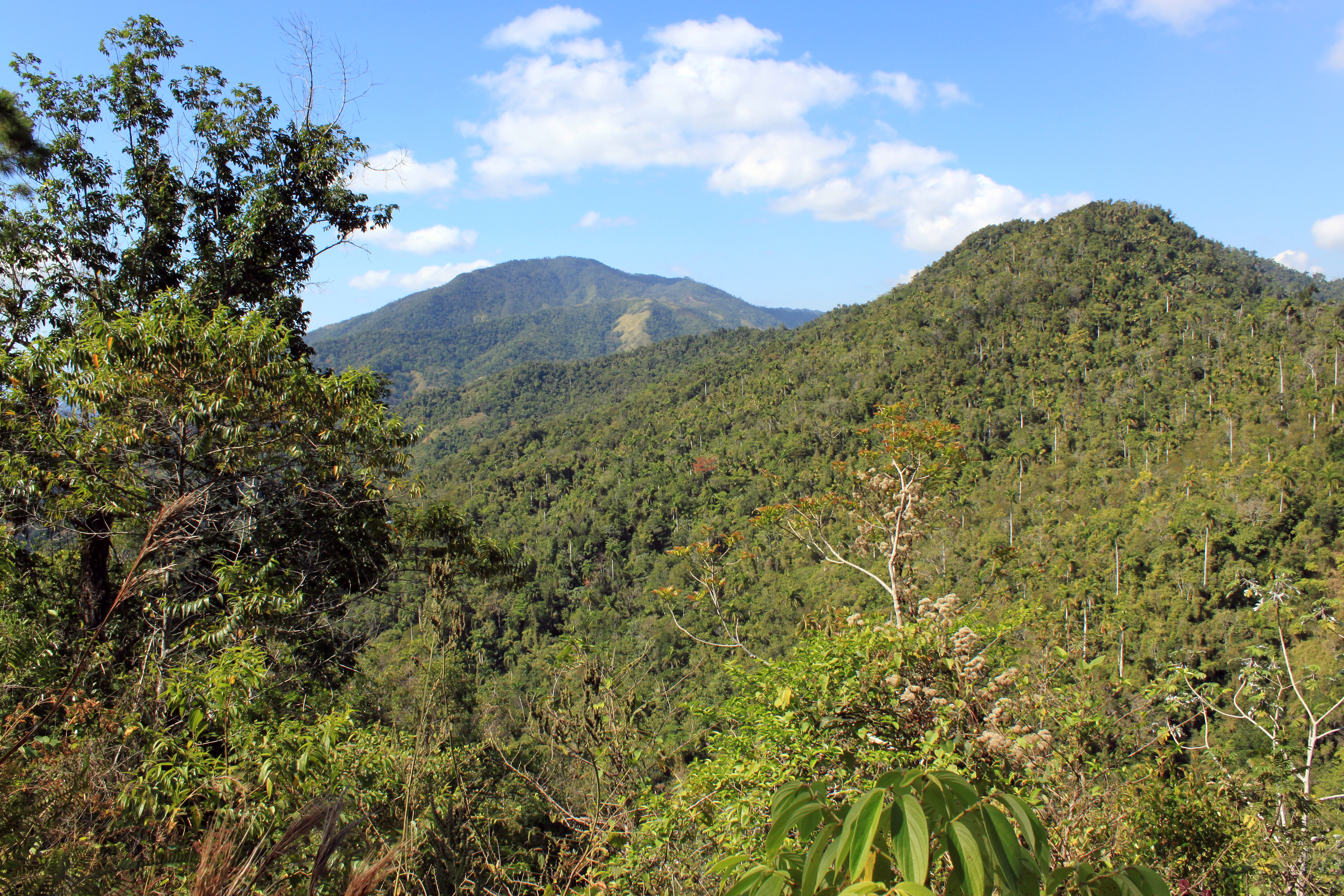
The Sierra Maestra mountains with Cuban pine forests in the park.

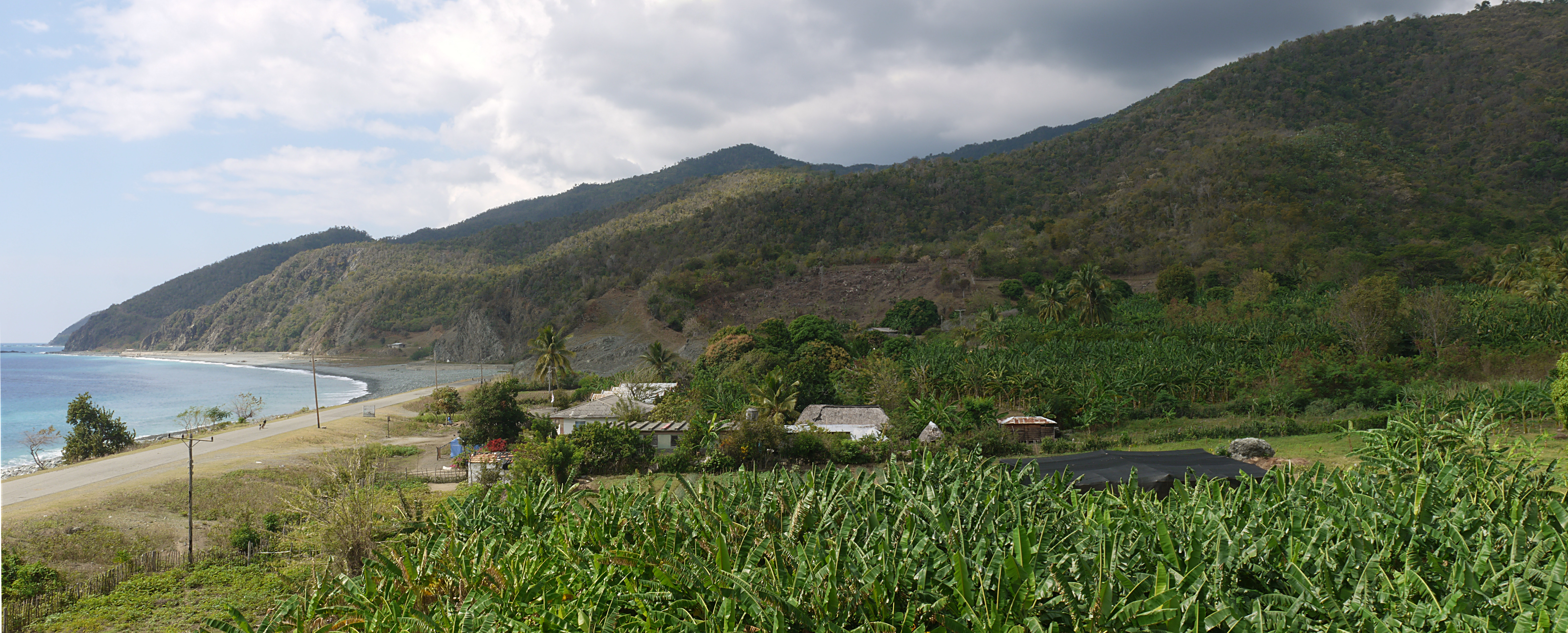
Las Cuevas trailhead at the coast.

The park has tropical forest habitats, including the lower elevation Cuban moist forests and higher elevation Cuban pine forests ecoregions. It also has "some of the best-preserved cloud forests in the Caribbean".

Turquino and the adjoining Pico La Bayamesa National Park were together designated the Turquino - Bayamesa Important Bird Area. The bird species that qualified them for that status are the:

Note: Species in italics are non-resident.

- Cuban green woodpecker
- giant kingbird
- white-crowned pigeon
- Key West quail-dove
- blue-headed quail-dove
- Cuban emerald hummingbird
- great lizard cuckoo
- black-capped petrel
- Cuban pygmy owl
- bare-legged owl
- Gundlach's hawk
- Cuban trogon, Cuba's national bird
- Cuban tody
- Fernandina's flicker
- West Indian woodpecker
- Cuban pewee
- Loggerhead kingbird
- La Sagra's flycatcher
- Cuban vireo
- Cuban crow
- Cuban solitaire
- Bicknell's thrush
- Oriente warbler
- Hispaniolan oriole
- Cuban blackbird
- Greater Antillean grackle
- Western spindalis
- Cuban bullfinch
- Cuban grassquit
- grey-fronted quail-dove

Other animal species include the Cuban hutia, a large rodent, as well as several species of bats.

== Cuban Revolution ==
La Comandancia de la Plata, Fidel Castro's headquarters during the Cuban Revolution, was located in what is now the park.

Operation Verano, Cuban dictator Fulgencio Batista's 1958 attempt to destroy Castro's greatly outnumbered guerrilla band, which Castro had deployed west of Pico Turquino along a 15-mile (24 km) front. Its failure demoralized Batista's army.

== Bust ==
A bronze bust of national hero José Martí (1853–1895), sculpted by Jilma Madera, rests on Pico Turbino.

== See also ==
- National parks of Cuba
- Geography of Santiago de Cuba Province
