= Carpodiptera cubensis =

Conservation status
- Critically Endangered (IUCN 2.3)

Scientific classification
- Kingdom: Plantae
- Clade: Tracheophytes
- Clade: Angiosperms
- Clade: Eudicots
- Clade: Rosids
- Order: Malvales
- Family: Malvaceae
- Genus: Carpodiptera
- Species: C. cubensis

Binomial name
- Carpodiptera cubensis Griseb.

Subspecies
- Carpodiptera cubensis subsp. cubensis; Carpodiptera cubensis subsp. ophiticola (Bisse) A.Rodr.

Synonyms
- Berrya cubensis (Griseb.) M.Gómez

Species of flowering plant

Carpodiptera cubensis is a species of flowering plant in the family Malvaceae. It is a tree native to tropical Mexico, northern Central America, Cuba, and southern Haiti.

Two subspecies are accepted.

- Carpodiptera cubensis subsp. cubensis (synonyms Berrya ameliae (Lundell) Kosterm., B. floribunda (Urb.) Kosterm., B. mariarum (Standl.) Kosterm., Carpodiptera ameliae Lundell, C. floribunda Urb., C. mariarum Standl., and C. mirabilis Bisse) – Belize, Cuba, Guatemala, Haiti, Honduras, and eastern, southern, and central Mexico
- Carpodiptera cubensis subsp. ophiticola (Bisse) A.Rodr. (synonym Carpodiptera ophiticola Bisse) – Cuba

The IUCN Red List lists the synonym Carpodiptera mirabilis as Critically endangered, with a distribution limited to montane rainforests of Guantanamo Province of eastern Cuba.
