= Rolando Masferrer =

Cuban politician (1918–1975)

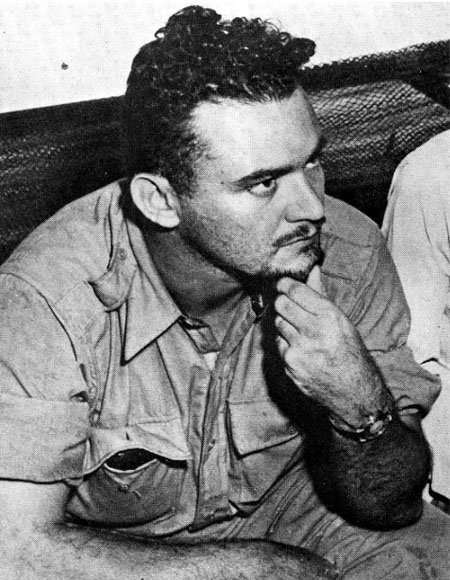
- Masferrer in 1959
- Born: 12 January 1918; Holguín, Oriente Province, Cuba
- Died: 31 October 1975 (aged 57); Miami, Florida, United States
- Education: University of Havana
- Occupations: Politician, businessman, journalist, and lawyer
- Political party: Partido Auténtico
- Other political affiliations: Popular Socialist Party (1935–1945)
- Spouse: Lucila Montero
- Children: Alejandro (Alex) Masferrer; Liudmila Masferrer
- Relatives: Rodolfo Masferrer (brother); Raimundo Masferrer (brother)

Rolando Arcadio Masferrer Rojas (Spanish: [roˈlando aɾˈkaðjo masfeˈreɾ ˈroxas]; 12 January 1918 – 31 October 1975) was a Cuban henchman, lawyer, congressman, newspaper publisher and a political activist.

Joining the leftist revolutionary movement as a teenager, he fought on the Republican side in the Spanish Civil War. Masferrer was elected to the Congress of Cuba for the Republican Party in 1948 and later became a supporter of dictator Fulgencio Batista. Masferrer created a counter-revolutionary guerrilla group known as "Tigres de Masferrer", which was intended to fight against M-26-7. He fled to the U.S. when Fidel Castro took power in Cuba. From there he plotted assassination and invasion attempts against Castro, all of which failed.

He was killed by a car bomb in Miami in 1975, aged 57.

== Family ==
Masferrer was born on 12 July 1918, in Holguín, former Oriente Province, Cuba. He married Lucila Montero and they had two children: Alejandro (Alex) and Liudmila. Rolando had two brothers: Rodolfo and Raimundo. All emigrated to the U.S. with Rolando on 1 January 1959.

== Cuba 1930s ==
Masferrer was a member of the leftist revolutionary Joven Cuba organization as a teenager. He participated in a murder plot against Colonel Jose Eleuterio Pedraza, head of Cuban National Police in 1936, and he was arrested. He was a member of Cuba's Communist Party (Popular Socialist Party) from 1935, but was expelled in 1945, and later became anti-communist. He was assistant editor of Hoy (Today), the Cuban communist daily between 1939-45. Later he published a socialist weekly called Tiempo en Cuba (Time in Cuba).

== Spanish Civil War ==
He formed part of the Abraham Lincoln Brigade in the Spanish Civil War in 1937. He was wounded in the left foot in Spain, and in Europe is said to have been an enforcer for the International Brigades, much feared for the thumping of his wounded gait when he approached his victim. He was lame for the rest of his life.

== 1940s Cuba ==
He graduated as a lawyer from the University of Havana with honors (Dolz Award) in 1945. Masferrer participated, with Fidel Castro and over 1,000 Cubans, in the aborted Cayo Confites expedition of 1947, which sought to overthrow Rafael Trujillo, the authoritarian leader of the Dominican Republic. He was a rival of Castro in the bloody feuds of the trigger happy action groups in Havana and subject of one failed attempt by Castro and others to kill to him in 1948. Masferrer was elected to the Cuban House of Representatives for the Republican Party in 1948. He was fluent in English, and appointed as an English teacher at Marianao High School in 1946. He was founder and leader of the Movimiento Socialista Revolucionario (MSR), that became a gang.

== 1950s Cuba ==
Masferrer was a staunch supporter of Cuban dictator Fulgencio Batista after the latter seized power in 1952. He was a Senator for the Partido Auténtico from 1955 to 1958 in the Batista government and the leading founder of Los Tigres de Masferrer, a paramilitary organization set up to protect Batista from guerrilla groups and support Batista militarily. In this period, he published two papers Tiempo in Havana and Libertad in Santiago de Cuba which insulted Francisco Franco, but without positive reaction among other leftwing Spanish Civil War exiles.

During the final years of the last Batista regime to the end of 1958, Masferrer and his Tigres operated in Oriente province; from headquarters in Victoria de las Tunas, or others claim from Santiago, Manzanillo and Bayamo He had an array of weapons including lethal large caliber "air rifles." His followers penetrated the Sierra Maestra with silence, terrifying local Escopeteros, who without time to react or appropriate weapons, fled before his forces; then the "tigres" fled. In this fashion the Tigres raided and killed in the foothills of the Sierra Maestra. He is known to have threatened Franciscan priests in Manzanillo, Cuba The Cuban government of Fidel Castro accused Masferrer of 2,000 killings - disputed by some - and said the Tigres were careful to remove all evidence.

Masferrer plotted to buy "La Hacienda Sevilla" and divide up the land so as to reward the local guajiros for informing on Fidel Castro in the first months of his operations in the Sierra Maestra. This connection may or may not explain the attempted betrayal of Castro by Agrarian Organizer Eutimio Guerra.

After Fidel Castro seized power in Cuba on 1 January 1959, Masferrer had to abandon the island. He fled on his yacht Ola Kun II, a former U.S. Coast Guard vessel with his family and over twenty followers on 1 January 1959, arriving in Key West, Florida. He received asylum in the U.S. and settled in Miami. Castro accused to Masferrer of stealing U.S. $17 million (disputed), and requested to the U.S. government the extradition of Masferrer back to Cuba. Castro's request was denied.

== U.S. 1960s and 1970s ==
In the United States, he was a friend of Mafia boss Santo Trafficante, whom he knew from Cuba. Trafficante and union leader Jimmy Hoffa funded Masferrer's various plots against Castro. He established the 30th of November organization, with the purpose of killing Castro. Masferrer was known for mistreating Cubans residing in Florida, extorting money from them for what he said would be "to help Cuba".

On 26 September 1960, Masferrer sent an expedition of four boats to Cuba. One boat reached the island, three Americans: Allan D. Thompson, Anthony Zarba and Robert O. Fuller were caught and eventually executed. In December, 1960, the Miami Herald, reported that Masferrer was leading a group of 53 people, undertaking training for assassination at a ranch owned by multi-millionaire Howard Hughes. In the early 1960s, Masferrer was associated with El Tiempo, a Spanish-language newspaper, edited by S. Ross, in New York City. In 1961, Masferrer met with President John F. Kennedy, to discuss Castro and the situation in Cuba. But Kennedy disliked Masferrer's radical and fanatical personality, and the two did not have any publicly known conversation after that.

In 1967, Masferrer plotted and accumulated weapons to invade Haiti and overthrow François Duvalier so as to have a base, free of U.S. law, to attack the Castro government which had foiled direct attempts to land (Project Nassau or Operation Istanbul). Masferrer served two years of a four-year sentence for two counts of violating the Neutrality Act of 1794 in the U.S. (1970–72). Five of his accomplices received lesser sentences. He owned a security agency in Miami, and published the weekly Libertad (Freedom). The Castro government had sentenced him to death in 1959. Masferrer was killed by a car bomb (specifically dynamite) on 31 October 1975. The assassination was allegedly ordered by the anti-Castro militant Guillermo Novo, who was soon to be associated with the US-backed Coordination of United Revolutionary Organizations and the assassination of Orlando Letelier by car bomb in 1976.
