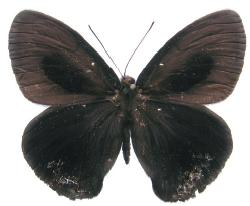
- Male, upperside
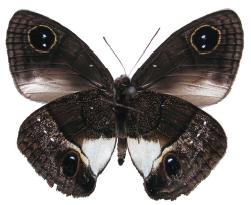
- Male, underside

Scientific classification
- Kingdom: Animalia
- Phylum: Arthropoda
- Class: Insecta
- Order: Lepidoptera
- Family: Nymphalidae
- Genus: Calisto
- Species: C. israeli

Binomial name
- Calisto israeli Torre, 1973

Synonyms
- Calisto israel Smith et al., 1994; Calisto sibylla smintheus Lamas, 2004

= Calisto israeli =

Species of butterfly

Calisto israeli is a butterfly of the family Nymphalidae. It is endemic to Cuba, where it is known from the middle and western parts of the Nipe-Sagua-Baracoa mountains, from the Monte Iberia plateau west to Cupeyal. The species has also been recorded from Sierra de Cristal. It is probably also present on the eastern half of Nipe-Sagua-Baracoa mountains. It can be found from 250 and 1,230 meters (820 and 4,040 ft), where it inhabits several variants of evergreen and rainforests and, to a lesser extent, wet sclerophyllous low forests.

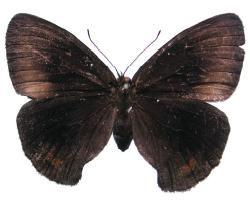
Female, upperside

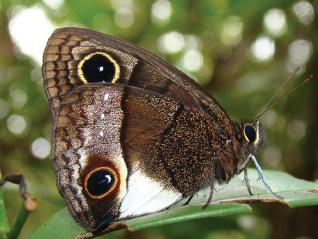

The length of the forewings is 24–26 mm (0.94–1.02 in) for males and 25–27 mm (0.98–1.06 in) for females.

Eggs are laid loose, are near spherical in shape and ivory white in color. The species seems to be associated with climbing grasses, such as Arthrostylidium pinifolia and Chusquea species.
