= Bactris jamaicana =

Conservation status
- Vulnerable (IUCN 2.3)

Scientific classification
- Kingdom: Plantae
- Clade: Tracheophytes
- Clade: Angiosperms
- Clade: Monocots
- Clade: Commelinids
- Order: Arecales
- Family: Arecaceae
- Genus: Bactris
- Species: B. jamaicana

Binomial name
- Bactris jamaicana L.H. Bailey

Species of plant (type of spiny palm)

Bactris jamaicana is a spiny palm which grows in multi-stemmed clumps. It is endemic to Jamaica.

== Description ==
Bactris jamaicana is a spiny palm with pinnately-compound leaves which grows in multi-stemmed clumps. These clumps usually consist of five to 30 stems ranging from 5 to 15 metres (16 to 49 ft) tall and 7.5 to 11.3 centimetres (3.0 to 4.4 in) in diameter. Stems normally bear 3 to 7 leaves. Male flowers are white, female flowers cream to pale yellow. The fruit are orange or red when mature, 9 to 11.8 millimetres (0.35 to 0.46 in) long.

== Taxonomy ==
Three species of Bactris are native to the Greater Antilles—B. jamaicana, which is endemic to Jamaica, B. plumeriana which is endemic to Hispaniola, and B. cubensis, which is endemic to Cuba. Virginia Salzman and Walter Judd found that these three species formed a clade—they are more closely related to one another than they are to other species within the genus.

=== History ===
In the second volume of his book A Voyage to the Islands Madera, Barbados, Nieves, S. Christophers and Jamaica (1725), Irish physician and naturalist Hans Sloane includes a description of a species of palm he names Prickly-Pole, which Salzman and Judd identified as Bactris jamaicensis. Olof Swartz included the species in Cocos acicularis Sw. in 1788, but transferred it to C. guineensis (L.) Sw. in 1791 (now considered a synonym of B. guineensis).

In his 1864 Flora of the British West Indies, August Grisebach lumped all Greater Antillean Bactris species into B. plumeriana. Odoardo Beccari maintained this classification in his 1912 work, The palms indigenous to Cuba. Max Burret had more specimens to work with, thanks to the collections of Erik Ekman and others in Cuba and Hispaniola, and was able to determine that plants from Cuba belonged to a separate species which he named B. cubensis. Liberty Hyde Bailey's collections from Jamaica allowed him to separate Jamaican plants into a new species which he named B. jamaicana in 1938.

== Distribution ==
Bactris jamaicana is endemic to the island of Jamaica. It grows in lower montane rain forests and savannas in the John Crow Mountains, Cockpit Country, and Central Plateau, between 330 and 860 metres (1,080 and 2,820 ft) above sea level.

The species is classified as a vulnerable species by the IUCN. Browne described it as abundant in 18th-century Jamaica, but it was rare by the middle of the 20th century.

== Uses ==
Sloane considered the tree to be the species in Jamaica that was "the most fit to make Rods and Scowrers for Guns" (ramrods), while Irish physician and botanist Patrick Browne described it as one of the primary food species for wild doves in his 1756 The Civil and Natural History of Jamaica. Bailey reported in 1938 that the fruit was fed to hogs and eaten by children, but Salzman and Judd's local informant was unaware of any utilization of the plant other than as a food source for birds.
