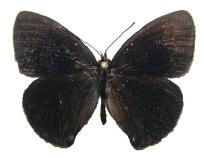
- Male, upperside
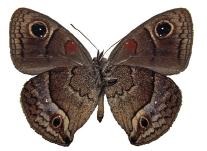
- Male, underside

Scientific classification
- Kingdom: Animalia
- Phylum: Arthropoda
- Class: Insecta
- Order: Lepidoptera
- Family: Nymphalidae
- Genus: Calisto
- Species: C. bruneri

Binomial name
- Calisto bruneri Michener, 1949

Synonyms
- Calisto herophile bruneri Alayo and Hernández 1987

= Calisto bruneri =

Species of butterfly

Calisto bruneri is a butterfly of the family Nymphalidae.

== Distribution ==
It is endemic to Cuba, where it occurs in the western parts of the Nipe-Sagua-Baracoa Mountains.

== Habitation ==
The species inhabits rainforests, wet sclerophyllous low forests and pine forests.

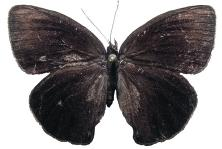
Female, upperside

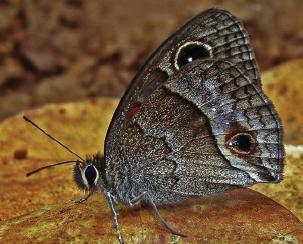

== Description ==
The length of the forewings is 16–19 mm for males and 18–21 mm for females. Adults have been observed taking nectar from flowers of Scaevola wrightii.
