= Claduncaria maestrana =

Scientific classification
- Kingdom: Animalia
- Phylum: Arthropoda
- Clade: Pancrustacea
- Class: Insecta
- Order: Lepidoptera
- Family: Tortricidae
- Genus: Claduncaria
- Species: C. maestrana

Binomial name
- Claduncaria maestrana Razowski & Becker, 2010

Species of moth

Claduncaria maestrana is a species of moth of the family Tortricidae. It is found in Cuba.

The wingspan is 13–16 mm.

== Etymology ==
The species name refers to the Maestra Range, the type locality.
