= Calisto batesi =

Scientific classification
- Domain: Eukaryota
- Kingdom: Animalia
- Phylum: Arthropoda
- Class: Insecta
- Order: Lepidoptera
- Family: Nymphalidae
- Genus: Calisto
- Species: C. batesi

Binomial name
- Calisto batesi Michener, 1943

Species of butterfly

Calisto batesi is a butterfly of the family Nymphalidae. It is endemic to Hispaniola.

The wingspan is 13–15 mm (0.51–0.59 in).

The larvae feed on various grasses.

== Taxonomy ==
It was formerly treated as a subspecies of Calisto hysius.
