= Pinus maestrensis =

Pinus x mastrensis

Scientific classification
- Kingdom: Plantae
- Clade: Tracheophytes
- Clade: Gymnospermae
- Division: Pinophyta
- Class: Pinopsida
- Order: Pinales
- Family: Pinaceae
- Genus: Pinus
- Subgenus: P. subg. Pinus
- Section: P. sect. Trifoliae
- Subsection: P. subsect. Australes
- Species: P. maestrensis

Binomial name
- Pinus maestrensis Bisse (1975)

Hybrid conifer found in Cuba

Pinus maestrensis, commonly known as the Sierra Maestra pine, or Pinus × maestrensis, is a hybrid conifer in the family Pinaceae.

It is endemic to Cuba, where it was described to be a hybrid of Pinus cubensis and another species of pine. Various Cuban botanists believe it is its own genetic species through evolution. DNA analysis tests were done which showed only some minor differences between the two taxa. This is proved to be not viable though, with hybridization as a main cause of the DNA differences, not evolution. The general conclusion is that Pinus maestrensis evolved much more recently through hybridization, while Pinus cubensis has been around for much longer as its own species. The known hybrid individuals reside in isolated stands on the Sierra Maestra, a mountain range in southern Cuba. Parts of the upper canopy on the Sierra Maestra are actually dominated by the hybrid pine species. It currently has a nothospecies classification.

Johannes Bisse described the type in 1975, assigning it the scientific name Pinus maestrensis.
