= Carpodiptera cubensis subsp. ophiticola =

Conservation status
- Endangered (IUCN 2.3)

Scientific classification
- Kingdom: Plantae
- Clade: Tracheophytes
- Clade: Angiosperms
- Clade: Eudicots
- Clade: Rosids
- Order: Malvales
- Family: Malvaceae
- Genus: Carpodiptera
- Species: C. cubensis
- Subspecies: C. c. subsp. ophiticola

Trinomial name
- Carpodiptera cubensis subsp. ophiticola (Bisse) A.Rodr.

Synonyms
- Carpodiptera ophiticola Bisse

Species of flowering plant

Carpodiptera cubensis subsp. ophiticola is a subspecies of flowering plant in the family Malvaceae. It is a shrub or small tree found only in Cuba. It is native to Canasí in Matanzas Province, where it grows near ravines and washes in serpentine outcrops. It is threatened by habitat loss, and the IUCN Red List assesses it as endangered.
