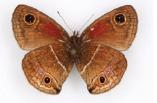

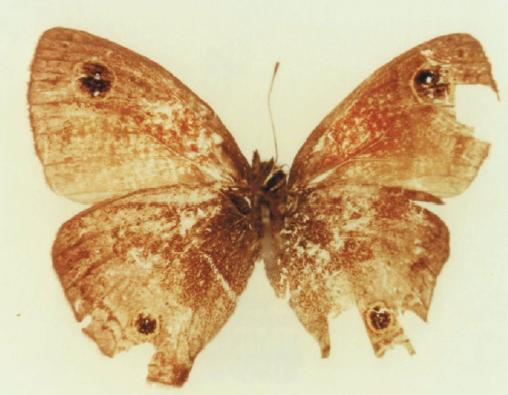
- The holotype of Calisto montana, now treated as a synonym of Calisto debarriera

Scientific classification
- Domain: Eukaryota
- Kingdom: Animalia
- Phylum: Arthropoda
- Class: Insecta
- Order: Lepidoptera
- Family: Nymphalidae
- Genus: Calisto
- Species: C. debarriera

Binomial name
- Calisto debarriera Clench, 1943

Synonyms
- Calisto neiba Schwartz & Gali, 1984; Calisto montana Clench, 1943; Calisto gonzalezi Schwartz, 1988

= Calisto debarriera =

Species of butterfly

Calisto debarriera is a butterfly of the family Nymphalidae. It is endemic to Hispaniola.

The larvae feed on various grasses.

== Taxonomy ==
Calisto debarriera was originally treated as subspecies of Calisto confusa, and later regarded as color variant of C. confusa.

== Gallery ==
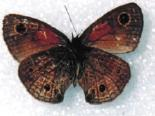
Calisto neiba, now treated as a synonym of Calisto debarriera
