= Eleutherodactylus glamyrus =

Conservation status
- Endangered (IUCN 3.1)

Scientific classification
- Kingdom: Animalia
- Phylum: Chordata
- Class: Amphibia
- Order: Anura
- Clade: Brachycephaloidea
- Family: Eleutherodactylidae
- Genus: Eleutherodactylus
- Subgenus: Eleutherodactylus
- Species: E. glamyrus

Binomial name
- Eleutherodactylus glamyrus Estrada & Hedges, 1997

Species of amphibian

Eleutherodactylus glamyrus is a species of frog in the family Eleutherodactylidae. It is endemic to western Cuba and known from isolated populations in Sierra Maestra, in the Granma and Santiago de Cuba provinces.

Its natural habitat is closed mesic cloud forest at elevations of 800–1,974 m (2,625–6,476 ft) asl. It is an arboreal species, but eggs are laid on the ground. Although a common in suitable habitat, it is declining in abundance. Major threat to is deforestation caused by agriculture, woodcutting, disturbance from tourist activities, and infrastructure development.

== Taxonomy ==
In 2017, a study combining genetic, morphological, and bioacoustic data revealed that E. glamyrus represented a complex of two distinct species. Populations in the Sierra del Cobre (eastern Sierra Maestra) were described as a new species, Eleutherodactylus cattus. Consequently, the range of E. glamyrus is now understood to be restricted to the Cordillera del Turquino and Pico La Bayamesa in the western Sierra Maestra.
