= Tasajera =

Tasajera may refer to:

- HMS Tasajera (F125)
- Tasajera explosion
- Calisto tasajera

== See also ==
- Tassajara, California
