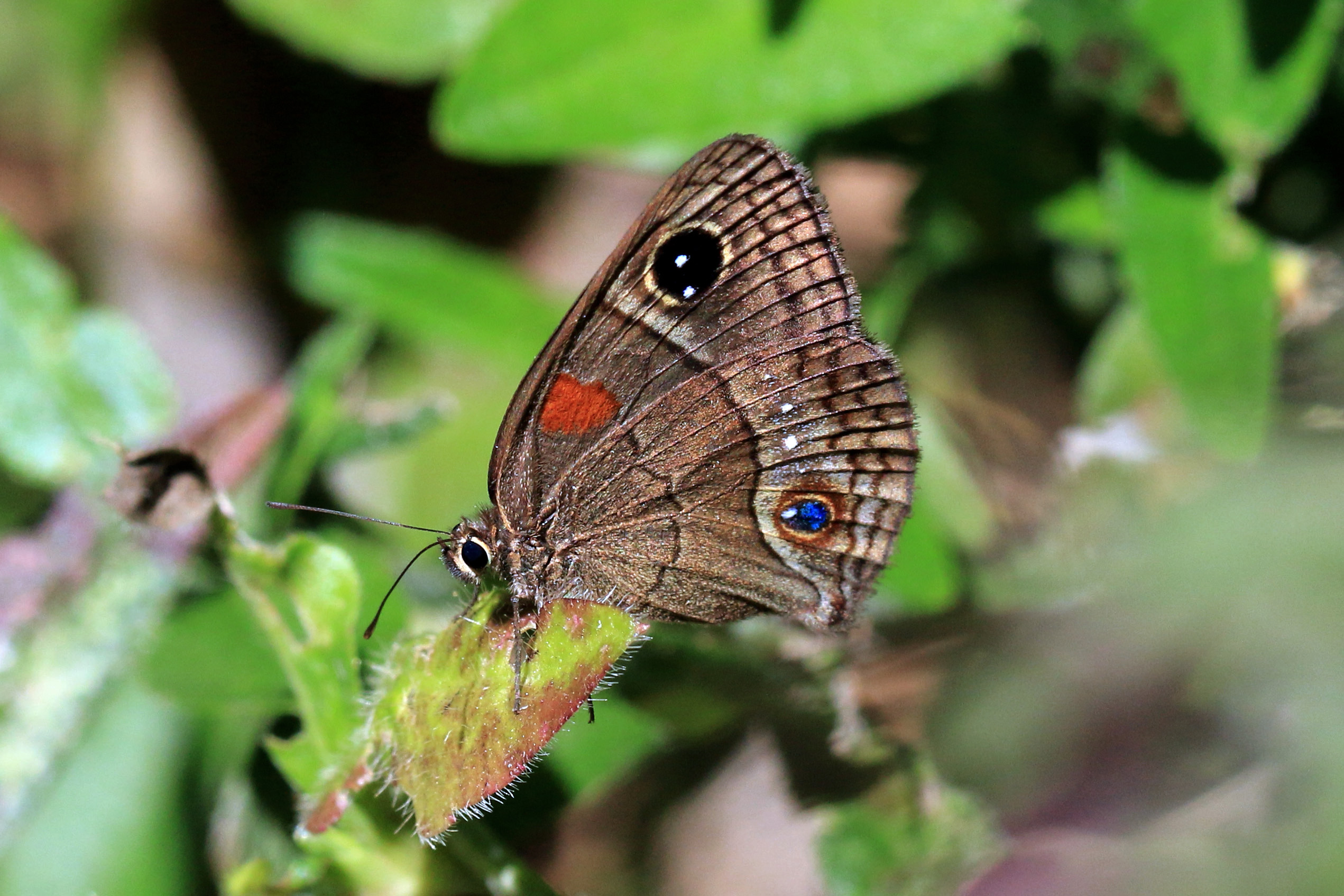
- In Cuba

Scientific classification
- Domain: Eukaryota
- Kingdom: Animalia
- Phylum: Arthropoda
- Class: Insecta
- Order: Lepidoptera
- Family: Nymphalidae
- Genus: Calisto
- Species: C. herophile

Binomial name
- Calisto herophile Hübner, 1823

Synonyms
- Satyrus herophile Poey, 1847

= Calisto herophile =

Species of butterfly

Calisto herophile is a butterfly of the family Nymphalidae. It is endemic to Cuba and the Bahamas. The species inhabits many habitats in Cuba, from suburban areas near major cities to the edges of evergreen and rainforests up to 1,100 meters of altitude, always disturbed in some degree.

The length of the forewings is 14–19 mm for males and 17–21 mm for females. Adults are found year-round throughout Cuba.

The larvae feed on various grasses.

== Subspecies ==
- Calisto herophile herophile (Cuba)
- Calisto herophile apollinis Bates, 1934
- Calisto herophile parsonsi Clench, 1943 (Cuba)

== Gallery ==
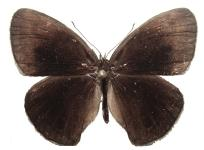
Male, upperside

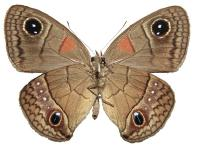
Male, underside

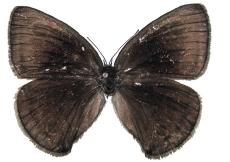
Female, upperside

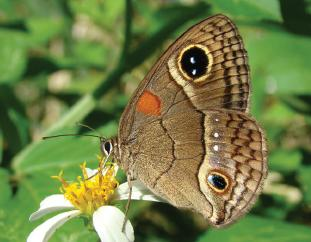

First instar larva

Fourth instar larva

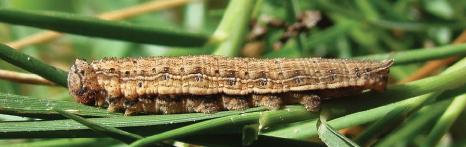
Fifth instar, pale morph

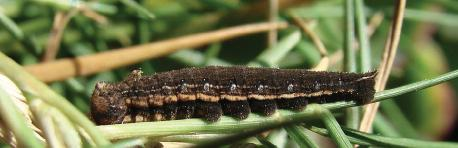
Fifth instar, dark morph

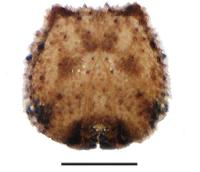
Fifth instar, head capsule

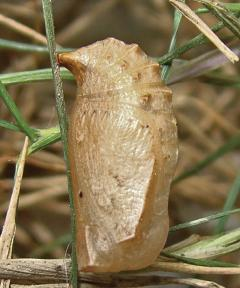
Pupa, lateral view

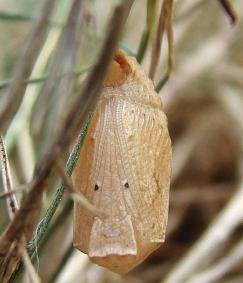
Pupa, ventral view

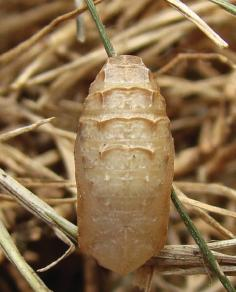
Pupa, dorsal view

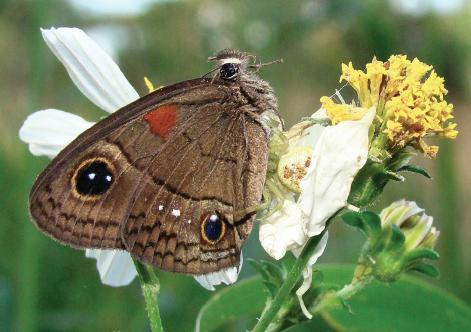
Predation by a crab spider of the family Thomisidae

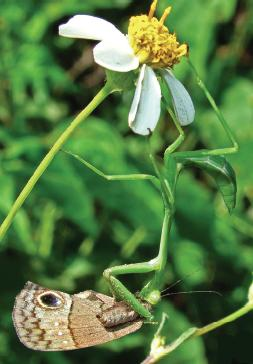
Predation by Stagmomantis domingensis
