= Action group (sociology) =

In sociology and anthropology, an action group or task group is a group of people joined temporarily to accomplish some task or take part in some organized collective action.

As the members of the action group are brought together on a single occasion and then disband, they cannot be regarded as constituting a full-fledged social group, for which they would need to interact recurrently in accordance with their social identities.

== In shareholder context ==
Action Groups are often formed by many shareholders when they disagree with actions by the Board of Directors of a Public Company or the Government like the forced Nationalisation of Northern Rock, Railtrack with 49,000 members. Action groups are co-ordinated by private investors in shareholder associations or their legal representatives in court. Institutional investors often find loose alliances with private investor led shareholder association action groups useful in applying mass political pressure or to publicly embarrass Directors at Annual general meetings into making changes.

The largest established shareholder action group associations are Sveriges Aktiesparares Riksförbund (the Swedish Shareholders' Association) part of the Euroshareholders group in the UK ShareSoc and UKSA (UK Shareholder Association),. American Shareholders Association, Australian Shareholders Association, and Japan Sōkaiya also have action groups.

== In Latin American context ==
In Cuba and elsewhere in Latin America, the word "action group" (grupo de acción) was given to violent activists who gathered together to perform violent guerrilla activities e.g. (see Antonio Guiteras, Fidel Castro, Emilio Tro, Lauro Blanco, and Rolando Masferrer when young university students) . Commonly regarded as gang-related killing there were said to have been 200 of these killings in the Grau administration alone.

(Martin, Lionel. The Early Fidel: Roots of Castro's Communism. 1978. Lyle Stuart, Secaucus New Jersey; 1st ed, p. 25). ISBN 0-8184-0254-7.
