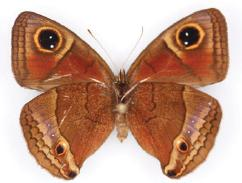

Scientific classification
- Domain: Eukaryota
- Kingdom: Animalia
- Phylum: Arthropoda
- Class: Insecta
- Order: Lepidoptera
- Family: Nymphalidae
- Genus: Calisto
- Species: C. nubila

Binomial name
- Calisto nubila Lathy, 1899

= Calisto nubila =

Species of insect

Calisto nubila is a butterfly of the family Nymphalidae. It is endemic to Puerto Rico.

The larvae feed on various grasses.
