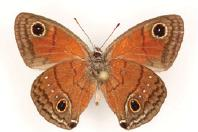

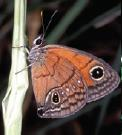

Scientific classification
- Domain: Eukaryota
- Kingdom: Animalia
- Phylum: Arthropoda
- Class: Insecta
- Order: Lepidoptera
- Family: Nymphalidae
- Genus: Calisto
- Species: C. lyceius

Binomial name
- Calisto lyceius Bates, 1935

= Calisto lyceius =

Species of butterfly

Calisto lyceius is a butterfly of the family Nymphalidae. It is endemic to Hispaniola, where it is found in the lowland desert.

The larvae feed on various species of bunch grass.
