= Christ of Havana =

Statue in Havana, Cuba

Coordinates: 23°08′38″N 82°20′42″W

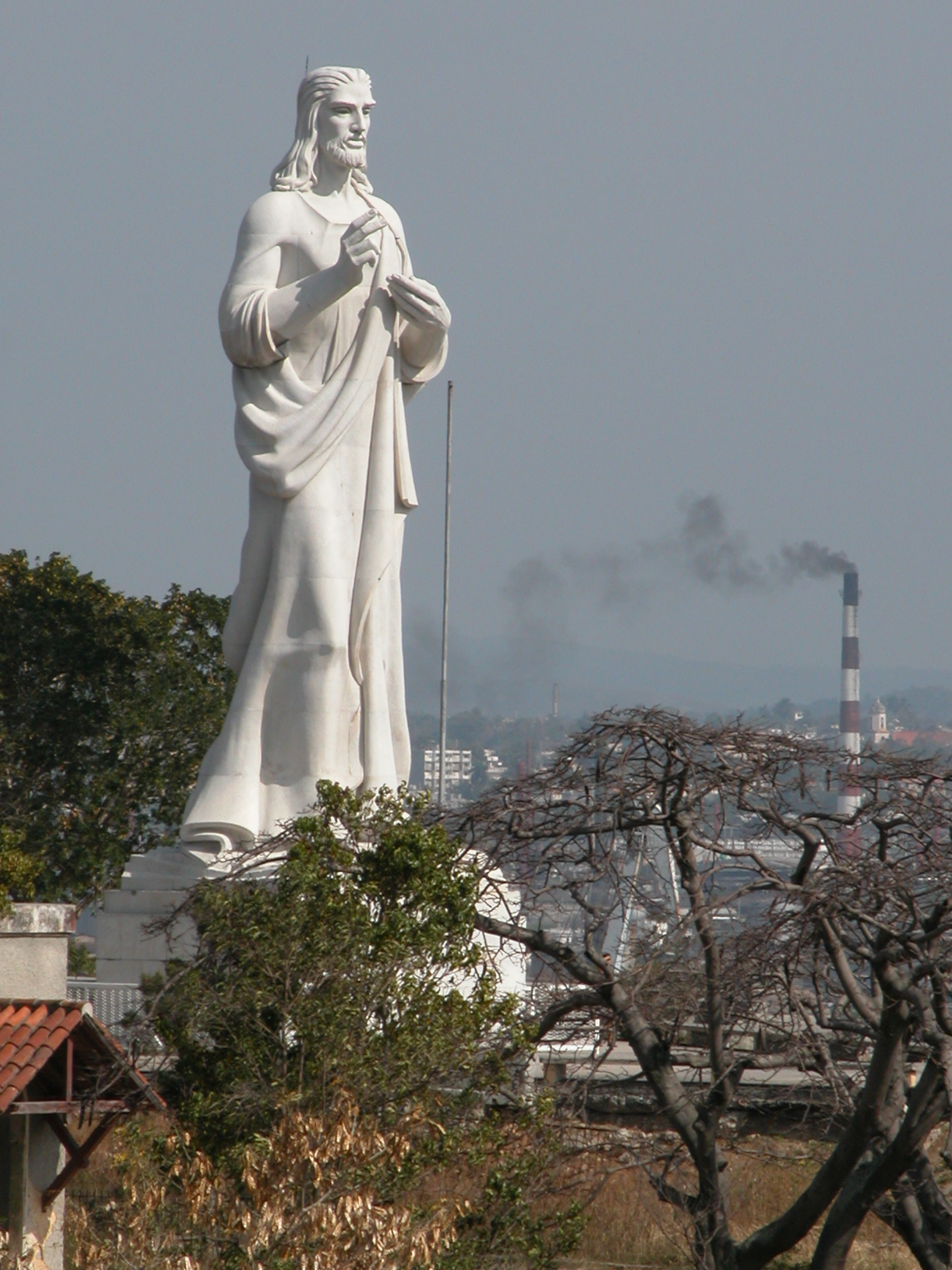
The Christ of Havana

The Christ of Havana (Spanish: Cristo de La Habana) is a large sculpture representing Jesus of Nazareth, on a hilltop overlooking the bay in Havana, Cuba. It is the work of the Cuban sculptor Jilma Madera, who won the commission for it in 1953.

== Overview ==
The statue was carved out of white Carrara marble, the same material used for many of the monuments of the Colon Cemetery. The statue is about 20 metres (66 ft) high including a 3-metre (10 ft) base. It weighs approximately 320 tons. The statue was built from 67 blocks of marble that had been brought from Italy after being personally blessed by Pope Pius XII. The figure of Christ is standing with the right hand held near the chin and the left hand near his chest. Facing the city, the statue was left with empty eyes to give the impression of looking at all, from anywhere to be seen.

The sculpture, located in the Havana suburb of Casablanca, in the municipality of Regla, was inaugurated on La Cabaña hill on December 24, 1958. Just fifteen days after its inauguration, on January 8, 1959, Fidel Castro entered Havana during the Cuban Revolution.

The sculpture is located 51 metres (167 ft) above sea level, rising to a height of 79 metres (259 ft), allowing the locals to see it from many points of the city. There is a panoramic viewpoint at the site of the sculpture.

Locals say that the statue is intended to depict Christ holding an imaginary cigar in the right hand, and a mojito in his left, honoring popular Cuban culture. Madera has said that the statue's facial features are intended to reflect the racial diversity of Cuba, and that its shoes were modelled on the flip-flops she wore while working in Italy.

== See also ==
- Christ the Redeemer, statue in Rio de Janeiro, Brazil
- Christ of the Ozarks, statue in Arkansas, U.S.
- List of statues of Jesus
- List of tallest statues
