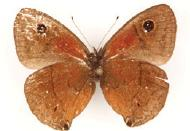

Scientific classification
- Domain: Eukaryota
- Kingdom: Animalia
- Phylum: Arthropoda
- Class: Insecta
- Order: Lepidoptera
- Family: Nymphalidae
- Genus: Calisto
- Species: C. raburni

Binomial name
- Calisto raburni Gali, 1985

= Calisto raburni =

Species of butterfly

Calisto raburni is a butterfly of the family Nymphalidae. It is endemic to Hispaniola.
