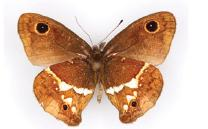

Scientific classification
- Kingdom: Animalia
- Phylum: Arthropoda
- Clade: Pancrustacea
- Class: Insecta
- Order: Lepidoptera
- Family: Nymphalidae
- Genus: Calisto
- Species: C. chrysaoros

Binomial name
- Calisto chrysaoros Bates, 1935

= Calisto chrysaoros =

Species of butterfly

Calisto chrysaoros is a butterfly of the family Nymphalidae. It is endemic to Hispaniola, where it is found at high elevations on both southern and northern paleoislands in the refugias.

The larvae feed on Arthrostylidium species.
