= Magnolia cristalensis =

Conservation status
- Vulnerable (IUCN 3.1)

Scientific classification
- Kingdom: Plantae
- Clade: Embryophytes
- Clade: Tracheophytes
- Clade: Spermatophytes
- Clade: Angiosperms
- Clade: Magnoliids
- Order: Magnoliales
- Family: Magnoliaceae
- Genus: Magnolia
- Subsection: Magnolia subsect. Cubenses
- Species: M. cristalensis

Binomial name
- Magnolia cristalensis Bisse

Synonyms
- Dugandiodendron cristalense (Bisse) Sima & S.G.Lu; Magnolia cristalensis subsp. baracoana Imkhan.; Magnolia cristalensis subsp. moana Imkhan.

Species of flowering plant

Magnolia cristalensis is a species of flowering plant in the family Magnoliaceae, described by Johannes Bisse in 1974. It is a tree endemic to eastern Cuba.
