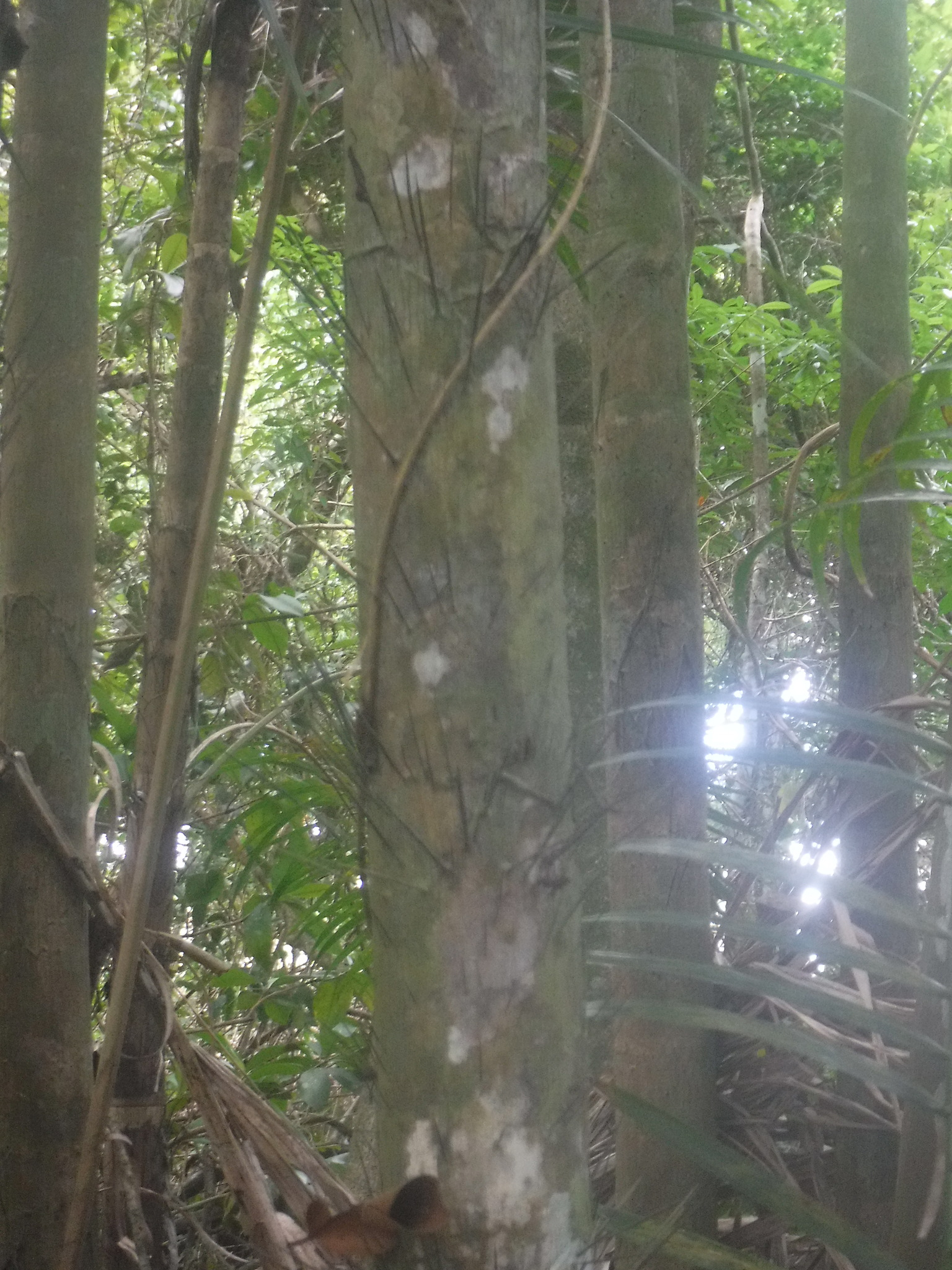

Conservation status
- Least Concern (IUCN 3.1)

Scientific classification
- Kingdom: Plantae
- Clade: Tracheophytes
- Clade: Angiosperms
- Clade: Monocots
- Clade: Commelinids
- Order: Arecales
- Family: Arecaceae
- Genus: Bactris
- Species: B. plumeriana

Binomial name
- Bactris plumeriana Mart.

= Bactris plumeriana =

Species of palm

Bactris plumeriana is a species of palm endemic to Hispaniola.

== Taxonomy ==
According to Salzman and Judd B. plumeriana forms a clade with B. cubensis and B. jamaicana, the other Greater Antillean Bactris species.
