= Carpodiptera =

Scientific classification
- Kingdom: Plantae
- Clade: Tracheophytes
- Clade: Angiosperms
- Clade: Eudicots
- Clade: Rosids
- Order: Malvales
- Family: Malvaceae
- Subfamily: Brownlowioideae
- Genus: Carpodiptera; Griseb.

Genus of flowering plants

Carpodiptera is a genus of flowering plants in the family Malvaceae. It includes four species which are native to eastern Africa and to Mexico, northern Central America, and Cuba, and Hispaniola.

== Species ==
Four species are accepted.

- Carpodiptera africana Mast.
- Carpodiptera cubensis Griseb.
  - Carpodiptera cubensis subsp. cubensis (synonym C. mirabilis Bisse)
  - Carpodiptera cubensis subsp. ophiticola (Bisse) A.Rodr. (synonym C. ophiticola Bisse)
- Carpodiptera hexaptera Urb. & Ekman
- Carpodiptera simonis Urb.
