= Bactris cubensis =

Conservation status
- Least Concern (IUCN 3.1)

Scientific classification
- Kingdom: Plantae
- Clade: Tracheophytes
- Clade: Angiosperms
- Clade: Monocots
- Clade: Commelinids
- Order: Arecales
- Family: Arecaceae
- Genus: Bactris
- Species: B. cubensis

Binomial name
- Bactris cubensis Burret

Species of palm

Bactris cubensis is a species of palm endemic to the Nipe-Baracoa Massif and eastern Sierra Maestra in eastern Cuba at elevations between 40 and 700 metres above sea level. B. cubensis trees grow 2.7 to 6.4 m tall in clumps of 6 to 12 stems.

According to Salzman and Judd, B. cubensis forms a clade with B. plumeriana and B. jamaicana, the other Greater Antillean Bactris species.
