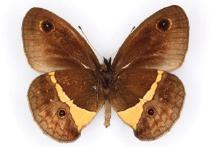

Scientific classification
- Domain: Eukaryota
- Kingdom: Animalia
- Phylum: Arthropoda
- Class: Insecta
- Order: Lepidoptera
- Family: Nymphalidae
- Genus: Calisto
- Species: C. archebates

Binomial name
- Calisto archebates (Ménétriés, 1832)

Synonyms
- Satyrus archebates Ménétriés, 1832

= Calisto archebates =

Species of butterfly

Calisto archebates is a butterfly of the family Nymphalidae. It is endemic to Hispaniola, where it is found in the southern paleoisland's Sierra de Bahoruco.

The larvae feed on Isachne rigifolia.
