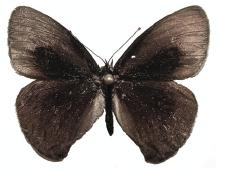
- Male, upperside
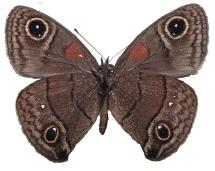
- Male, underside

Scientific classification
- Kingdom: Animalia
- Phylum: Arthropoda
- Class: Insecta
- Order: Lepidoptera
- Family: Nymphalidae
- Genus: Calisto
- Species: C. bradleyi

Binomial name
- Calisto bradleyi Munroe, 1950

Synonyms
- Calisto smintheus bradleyi Munroe, 1950; Calisto sibylla bradleyi Brown and Heineman, 1972

= Calisto bradleyi =

Species of butterfly

Calisto bradleyi is a butterfly of the family Nymphalidae. It is endemic to Cuba, where it is found in the major mountain range of western Cuba, Guaniguanico, from El Taburete, at Sierra del Rosario, west to Viñales valley, always at low elevations.

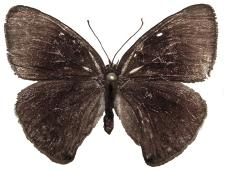
Female, upperside

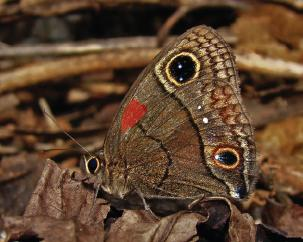

The length of the forewings is 17–20 mm for males and 20–21 mm for females.
