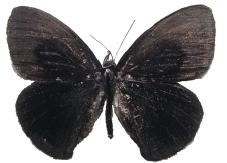
- Male, upperside
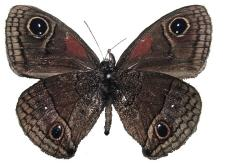
- Male, underside

Scientific classification
- Kingdom: Animalia
- Phylum: Arthropoda
- Class: Insecta
- Order: Lepidoptera
- Family: Nymphalidae
- Genus: Calisto
- Species: C. occulta

Binomial name
- Calisto occulta Núñez, 2012

= Calisto occulta =

Species of butterfly

Calisto occulta is a butterfly of the family Nymphalidae. It is endemic to Cuba, where it is known from a few localities from the middle part of the Nipe-Sagua-Baracoa mountains, from the Monte Iberia plateau north to near Yamanigüey, in north-eastern Cuba.

The length of the forewings is 17–20 mm for males and 18–21 mm for females.

The larvae feed on various grasses.

== Gallery ==
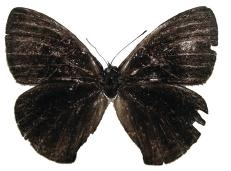
Female, upperside

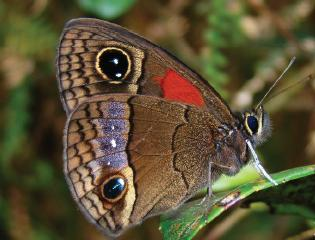

First instar larva

Second instar larva

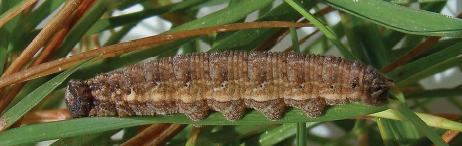
Sixth instar, lateral view

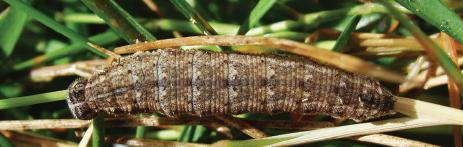
Sixth instar, dorsal view

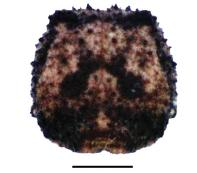
Sixth instar, head capsule

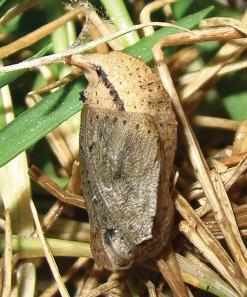
Pupa, lateral view

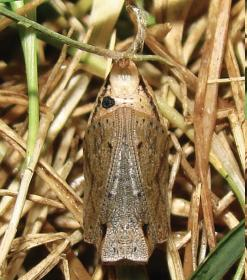
Pupa, ventral view
