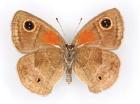

Scientific classification
- Domain: Eukaryota
- Kingdom: Animalia
- Phylum: Arthropoda
- Class: Insecta
- Order: Lepidoptera
- Family: Nymphalidae
- Genus: Calisto
- Species: C. obscura

Binomial name
- Calisto obscura Michener, 1943

= Calisto obscura =

Species of butterfly

Calisto obscura is a butterfly of the family Nymphalidae. It is endemic to Hispaniola, where it is found in the lowlands and at mid-elevations.

The larvae feed on various grasses.
