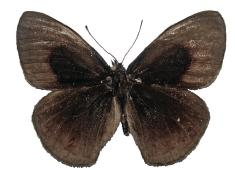
- Male, upperside
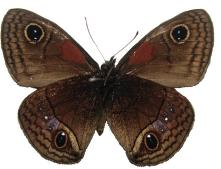
- Male, underside

Scientific classification
- Kingdom: Animalia
- Phylum: Arthropoda
- Class: Insecta
- Order: Lepidoptera
- Family: Nymphalidae
- Genus: Calisto
- Species: C. muripetens

Binomial name
- Calisto muripetens Bates, 1939

Synonyms
- Calisto smintheus muripetens Bates, 1939; Calisto sibylla muripetens Fontenla and Rodríguez, 1990

= Calisto muripetens =

Species of butterfly

Calisto muripetens is a butterfly of the family Nymphalidae. It is endemic to Cuba, where it is only known from a few localities in the central Cuban mountains: the Guamuhaya massif, above 750 meters and up to 1,140 meters on Pico San Juan, the highest peak.

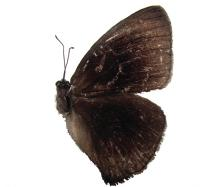
Female, upperside

The length of the forewings is 18–22 mm for males and 20–23 mm for females.
