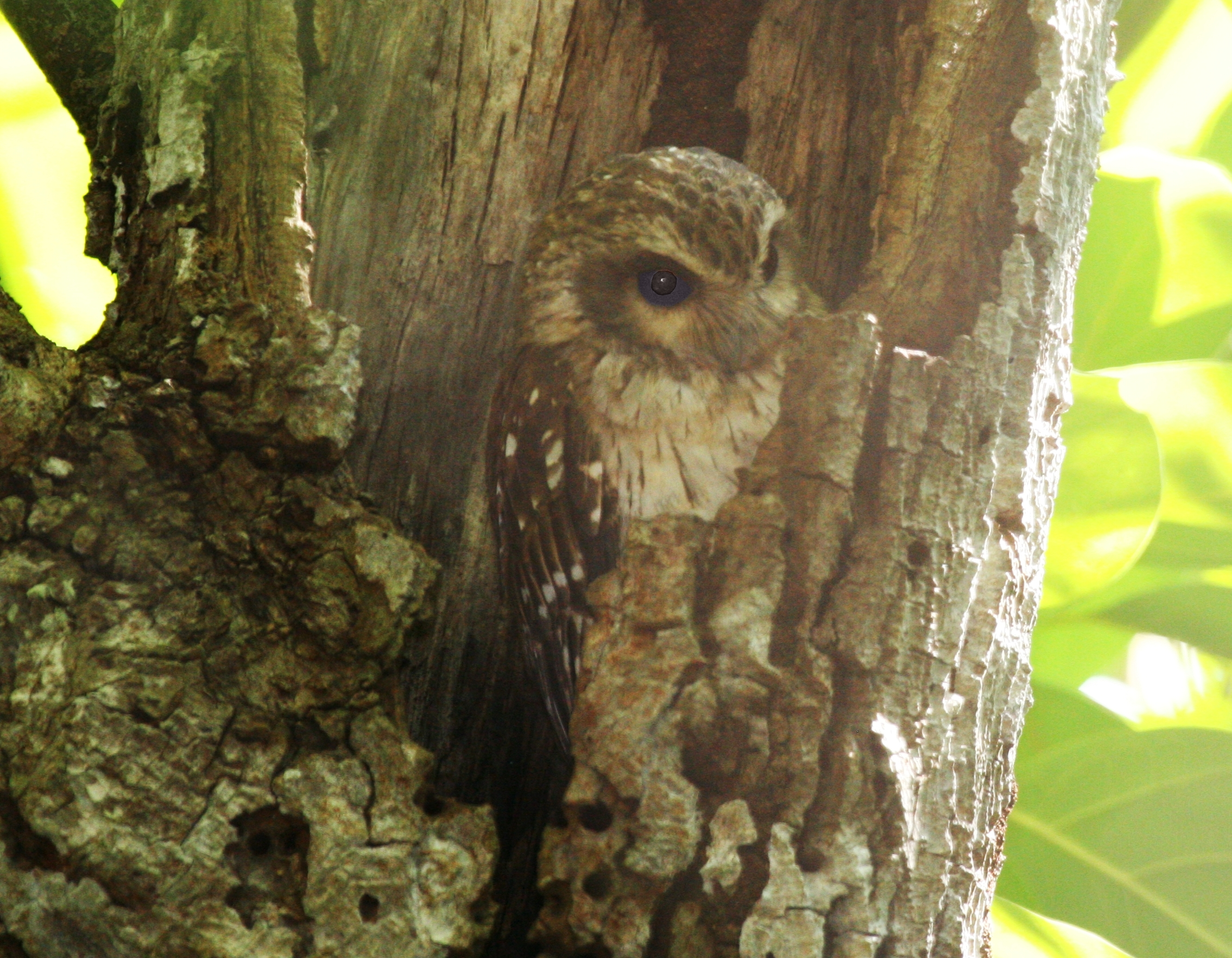

Conservation status
- Least Concern (IUCN 3.1)
- CITES Appendix II (CITES)

Scientific classification
- Kingdom: Animalia
- Phylum: Chordata
- Class: Aves
- Order: Strigiformes
- Family: Strigidae
- Genus: Margarobyas; Olson & Suárez, 2008
- Species: M. lawrencii

Binomial name
- Margarobyas lawrencii (Sclater, PL & Salvin, 1868)

Species
- Margarobyas lawrencii; †Margarobyas abronensis

Synonyms
- Gymnasio lawrencii Otus lawrencii Gymnoglaux lawrencii

= Bare-legged owl =

Species of owl

The bare-legged owl (Margarobyas lawrencii), also called the Cuban bare-legged owl or Cuban screech owl, is a species of owl in the family Strigidae that is endemic to Cuba and Isla de la Juventud. It belongs to the monotypic genus Margarobyas.

== Taxonomy and etymology ==
The bare-legged owl was described in 1800 and for a time, it was considered the same species as the Puerto Rican owl. However, it was later determined to be its own species by George Newbold Lawrence in 1868. It has variously been placed in the genera "Noctua", Gymnoglaux, and Gymnasio. The American Ornithological Society moved it to the genus Otus in 1998. However, in 2003, they moved the bird back to the genus Gymnoglaux based on physical and vocal differences between the bare-legged owl and typical screech-owls. Finally, in 2008, the genus Margarobyas was proposed, as it was found that Gymnoglaux was a junior synonym of Gymnasio.

Two subspecies have been accepted by some authors in the past, with M. l. exsul, found in western Cuba and the Isla de Juventud, and nominate M. l. lawrencii in the rest of Cuba. M. l. exsul is supposedly differentiated by a darker brown color and more spots, although this subspecies is no longer recognized.

Margarobyas comes from the Greek margarites, a pearl, and byas, an owl. This name was given as a reference to Cuba's status as the "Pearl of the Antilles". The species name, lawrencii, is in honor of George Lawrence.

== Description ==
The bare-legged owl is relatively small, measuring 20–23 cm (8–9 in) long, and weighing about 80 g (2.8 oz). Its name comes from its featherless green-yellow legs, similar to those of the burrowing owl. These owls have dark brown eyes, no ear tufts, a cream-colored facial disk, and brown rictal bristles. The upperparts of these birds are largely brown to slightly rufous in colour. Their wing feathers have white barring, and there are white spots on their shoulder and scapular feathers. The underparts are gray- to yellow-white, with some brown streaking and occasionally even cross-barring on the sides and breast.

Juvenile bare-legged owls have similar plumage colors to adults, but have fewer white spots.

== Biology ==
The natural habitats of the bare-legged owl are dry forests, lowland moist forests, and heavily degraded former forest. It particularly prefers stands of palm trees. Most of its foraging is done on the ground, and it is strictly nocturnal. The bare-legged owl eats primarily insects and other arthropods. It will less frequently eat frogs, snakes, and occasionally small birds.

These birds are secondary cavity nesters, requiring either woodpecker holes (particularly in palm trees) or natural openings in trees or rock crevices. Not much is known of their breeding ecology, but breeding season is January to June. The average clutch size is two eggs, which are incubated by the female owl.
