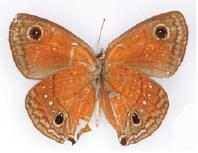

Scientific classification
- Domain: Eukaryota
- Kingdom: Animalia
- Phylum: Arthropoda
- Class: Insecta
- Order: Lepidoptera
- Family: Nymphalidae
- Genus: Calisto
- Species: C. franciscoi

Binomial name
- Calisto franciscoi Gali, 1985

Synonyms
- Calisto hendersoni Gali, 1985

= Calisto franciscoi =

Species of butterfly

Calisto franciscoi is a butterfly of the family Nymphalidae. It is endemic to parts of Hispaniola, where it is found in the lowland desert.

The larvae feed on various species of Brunch grass.
