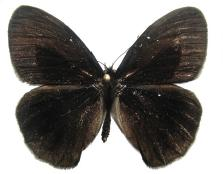
- Male, upperside
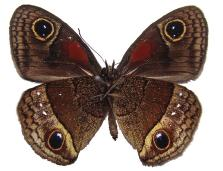
- Male, underside

Scientific classification
- Kingdom: Animalia
- Phylum: Arthropoda
- Class: Insecta
- Order: Lepidoptera
- Family: Nymphalidae
- Genus: Calisto
- Species: C. brochei

Binomial name
- Calisto brochei Torre, 1973

Synonyms
- Calisto smintheus brochei Torre, 1973; Calisto sibylla smintheus Fontenla and Rodríguez, 1990

= Calisto brochei =

Species of butterfly

Calisto brochei is a butterfly of the family Nymphalidae. It is endemic to Cuba, where it is present in several localities in the middle and western Nipe-Sagua-Baracoa mountains, from the Monte Iberia plateau west to the Pinares de Mayarí at Nipe plateau. The species inhabits several variants of rain and evergreen forests at altitudes between 200 and 800 meters. Individuals can be found mainly at shady forest paths.

The length of the forewings is 16–22 mm for males and 20–22 mm for females.

The larvae feed on various grasses. They eat the entire shell after hatching and feed at night, remaining in the lower parts of grasses during the day.

== Gallery ==
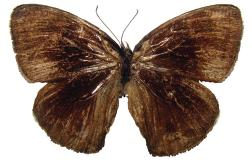
Female, upperside

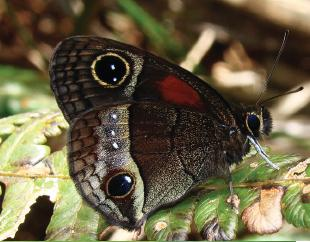

First instar larva

Fourth instar larva

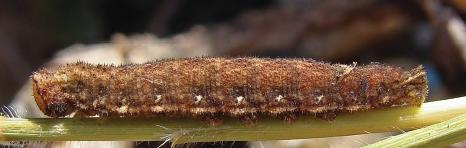
Sixth instar, lateral view

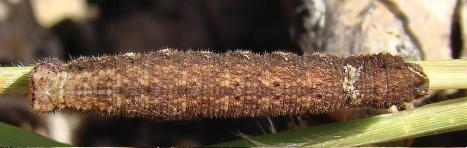
Sixth instar, dorsal view

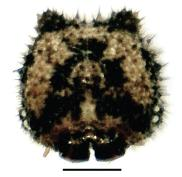
Sixth instar, head capsule

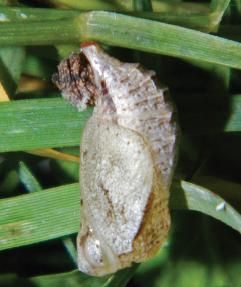
Pupa, lateral view

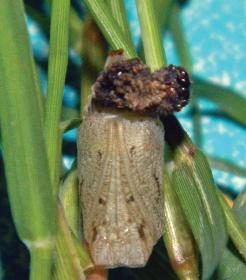
Pupa, ventral view

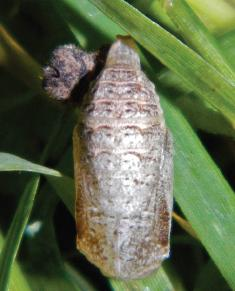
Pupa, dorsal view
