= Claduncaria =

Scientific classification
- Domain: Eukaryota
- Kingdom: Animalia
- Phylum: Arthropoda
- Class: Insecta
- Order: Lepidoptera
- Family: Tortricidae
- Tribe: Archipini
- Genus: Claduncaria; Razowski, 2000

Synonyms
- Cladotaenia Razowski, 1999 (preocc. Banghami)

Genus of tortrix moths

Claduncaria is a genus of moths belonging to the family Tortricidae.

== Species ==
- Claduncaria maestrana Razowski & Becker, 2010
- Claduncaria ochrochlaena (Razowski, 1999)
- Claduncaria rufochlaena Razowski & Becker, 2000

== See also ==
- List of Tortricidae genera
