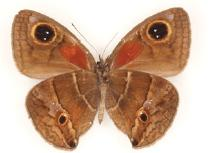

Scientific classification
- Domain: Eukaryota
- Kingdom: Animalia
- Phylum: Arthropoda
- Class: Insecta
- Order: Lepidoptera
- Family: Nymphalidae
- Genus: Calisto
- Species: C. eleleus

Binomial name
- Calisto eleleus Bates, 1935

= Calisto eleleus =

Species of butterfly

Calisto eleleus is a butterfly of the family Nymphalidae. It is endemic to Hispaniola, where it is found extremely locally in the Cordillera Central.
