= Claduncaria ochrochlaena =

Scientific classification
- Domain: Eukaryota
- Kingdom: Animalia
- Phylum: Arthropoda
- Class: Insecta
- Order: Lepidoptera
- Family: Tortricidae
- Genus: Claduncaria
- Species: C. ochrochlaena

Binomial name
- Claduncaria ochrochlaena (Razowski, 1999)

Synonyms
- Cladotaenia ochrochlaena Razowski, 1999

Species of moth

Claduncaria ochrochlaena is a species of moth of the family Tortricidae. It is found in the Dominican Republic.
