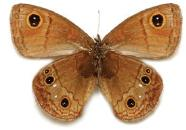
- Calisto grannus

Scientific classification
- Kingdom: Animalia
- Phylum: Arthropoda
- Class: Insecta
- Order: Lepidoptera
- Family: Nymphalidae
- Subtribe: Pronophilina
- Genus: Calisto (Hübner, 1823)

= Calisto (butterfly) =

Genus of butterflies

Calisto is a butterfly genus from the subfamily Satyrinae in the family Nymphalidae. The genus was erected by Jacob Hübner in 1823. Members of the genus occur on the Caribbean islands only. Of the 44 species that are currently thought to exist, eleven occur on Cuba, one on Puerto Rico, one on Anegada Island, one on Jamaica, two on the Bahamas and twenty-eight on Hispaniola.

== Species ==
In alphabetical order:

- Calisto ainigma Johnson, Quinter & Matusik, 1987
- Calisto anegadensis Smith, Miller & McKenzie, 1991
- Calisto apollinis Bates, 1934
- Calisto aquilum Núñez, 2013
- Calisto arcas Bates, 1939
- Calisto archebates (Ménétriés, 1832)
- Calisto batesi Michener, 1943
- Calisto bradleyi Munroe, 1950
- Calisto brochei Torre, 1973
- Calisto bruneri Michener, 1949
- Calisto chrysaoros Bates, 1935
- Calisto chlenchi Schwartz & Gali, 1984
- Calisto clydoniata Schwartz & Gali, 1984
- Calisto confusa Lathy, 1899
- Calisto crypta Gali, 1985
- Calisto debarriera Clench, 1943
- Calisto dissimulatum Núñez, 2013
- Calisto eleleus Bates, 1935
- Calisto franciscoi Gali, 1985
- Calisto grannus Bates, 1939
- Calisto herophile Hübner, [1823]
- Calisto hysius (Godart, [1824])
- Calisto israeli Torre, 1973
- Calisto loxias Bates, 1935
- Calisto lyceius Bates, 1935
- Calisto muripetens Bates, 1939
- Calisto neochma Schwartz, 1991
- Calisto nubila Lathy, 1899
- Calisto obscura Michener, 1943
- Calisto occulta Núñez, 2012
- Calisto pauli Johnson & Hedges, 1998
- Calisto pulchella Lathy, 1899
- Calisto raburni Gali, 1985
- Calisto schwartzi Gali, 1985
- Calisto sibylla Bates, 1934
- Calisto smintheus Bates, 1935
- Calisto tasajera González, Schwartz & Wetherbee, 1991
- Calisto thomasi Johnson & Hedges, 1998
- Calisto torrei Núñez, 2013
- Calisto tragius Bates, 1935
- Calisto wetherbeei Schwartz & González, 1988
- Calisto woodsi Johnson & Hedges, 1998
- Calisto zangis (Fabricius, 1775)
