= Claduncaria rufochlaena =

Scientific classification
- Kingdom: Animalia
- Phylum: Arthropoda
- Clade: Pancrustacea
- Class: Insecta
- Order: Lepidoptera
- Family: Tortricidae
- Genus: Claduncaria
- Species: C. rufochlaena

Binomial name
- Claduncaria rufochlaena Razowski & Becker, 2000

Species of moth

Claduncaria rufochlaena is a species of moth of the family Tortricidae. It is found in Jamaica.
