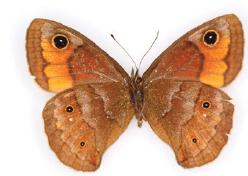

Scientific classification
- Kingdom: Animalia
- Phylum: Arthropoda
- Clade: Pancrustacea
- Class: Insecta
- Order: Lepidoptera
- Family: Nymphalidae
- Genus: Calisto
- Species: C. arcas

Binomial name
- Calisto arcas Bates, 1939

= Calisto arcas =

Species of butterfly

Calisto arcas is a butterfly of the family Nymphalidae. It is endemic to Hispaniola, where it is only found in the Cordillera Central's Valle Nuevo area.

The larvae probably feed on bamboo.
