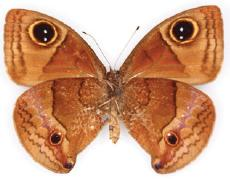

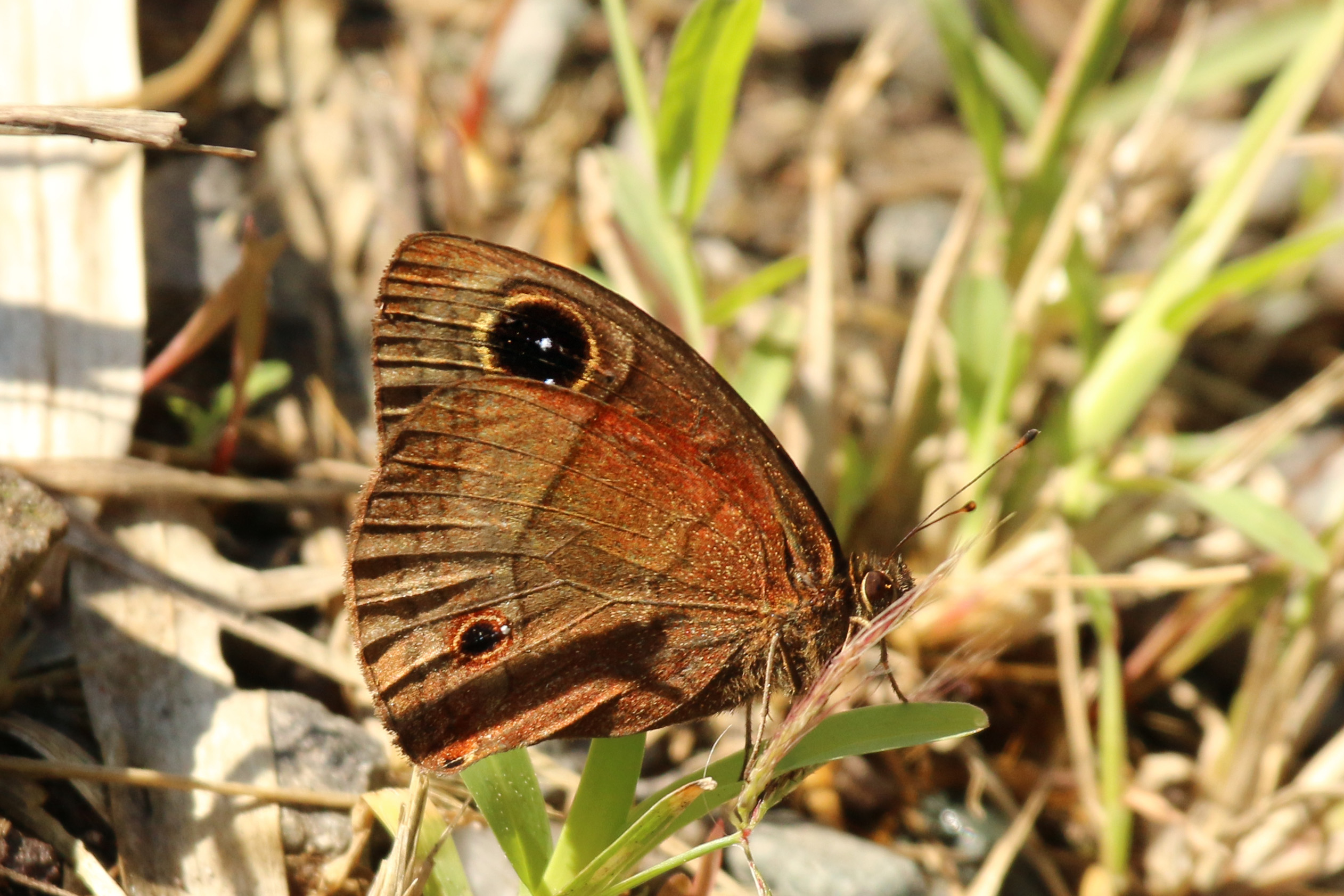

Scientific classification
- Domain: Eukaryota
- Kingdom: Animalia
- Phylum: Arthropoda
- Class: Insecta
- Order: Lepidoptera
- Family: Nymphalidae
- Genus: Calisto
- Species: C. zangis

Binomial name
- Calisto zangis (Fabricius, 1775)

Synonyms
- Papilio zangis Fabricius, 1775; Papilio agnes Stoll, 1780

= Calisto zangis =

Jamaican satyr

Species of butterfly

Calisto zangis, the Jamaican satyr is a butterfly of the family Nymphalidae. It is endemic to Jamaica and the Guianas.
