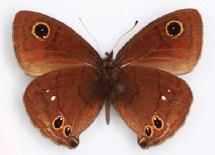

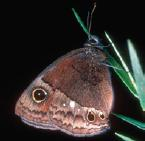

Scientific classification
- Domain: Eukaryota
- Kingdom: Animalia
- Phylum: Arthropoda
- Class: Insecta
- Order: Lepidoptera
- Family: Nymphalidae
- Genus: Calisto
- Species: C. tasajera

Binomial name
- Calisto tasajera González, Schwartz & Wetherbee, 1991

= Calisto tasajera =

Species of butterfly

Calisto tasajera is a butterfly of the family Nymphalidae. It is endemic to Hispaniola, where it is found in the highlands of the Cordillera Central.

The larvae feed on Danthonia domingenisis.
