= Bactris guineensis =

Conservation status
- Least Concern (IUCN 3.1)

Scientific classification
- Kingdom: Plantae
- Clade: Tracheophytes
- Clade: Angiosperms
- Clade: Monocots
- Clade: Commelinids
- Order: Arecales
- Family: Arecaceae
- Genus: Bactris
- Species: B. guineensis

Binomial name
- Bactris guineensis (L.) H.E.Moore

Synonyms
- Cocos guineensis L.; Bactris horrida Oerst.; Bactris minor Jacq.; Bactris oraria L.H.Bailey; Bactris piritu (H.Karst.) H.Wendl.; Bactris rotunda Stokes; Cocos acicularis Sw.; Guilielma piritu H.Karst.

Species of flowering plant

Bactris guineensis, also known as Tobago cane, corozo, huiscoyal, or uvita, is an evergreen tree in the family Arecaceae. It is native to Central America and Venezuela.

== Description ==
Bactris guineensis grows to around 2.5 m (8 ft) to 3 m (10 ft) in height. Its stems and side leaves are covered in thin yellow spines. Flowers are white or cream in color.

The fruit is edible and has a mildly acidic flavor. It is spherical with a diameter of about 2 cm and grows in clusters. When ripe, the fruit is dark purple.

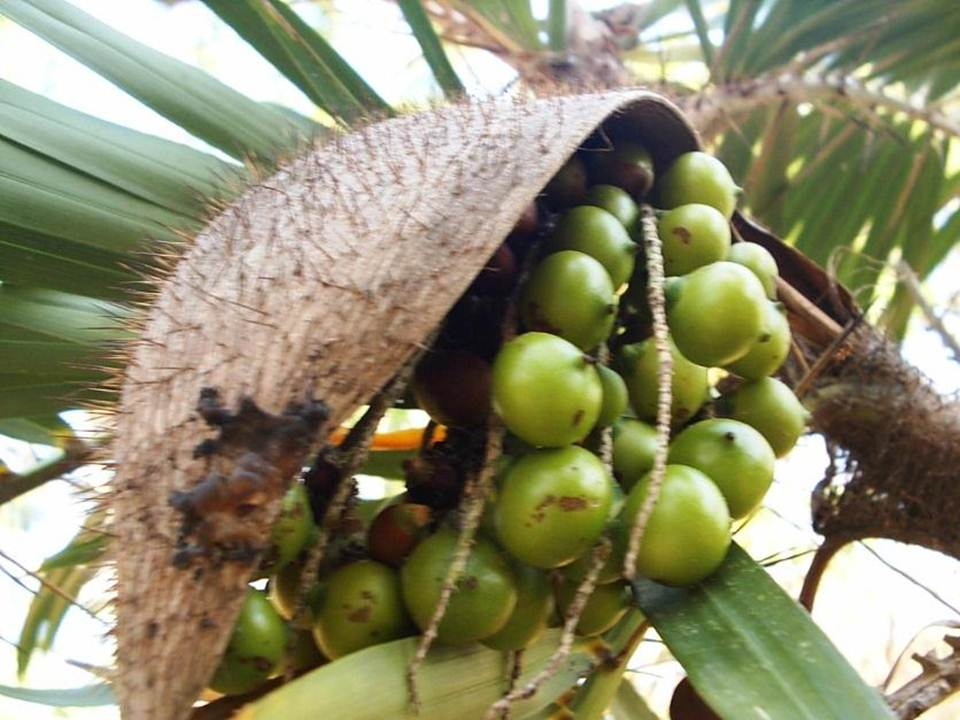
Unripe fruit

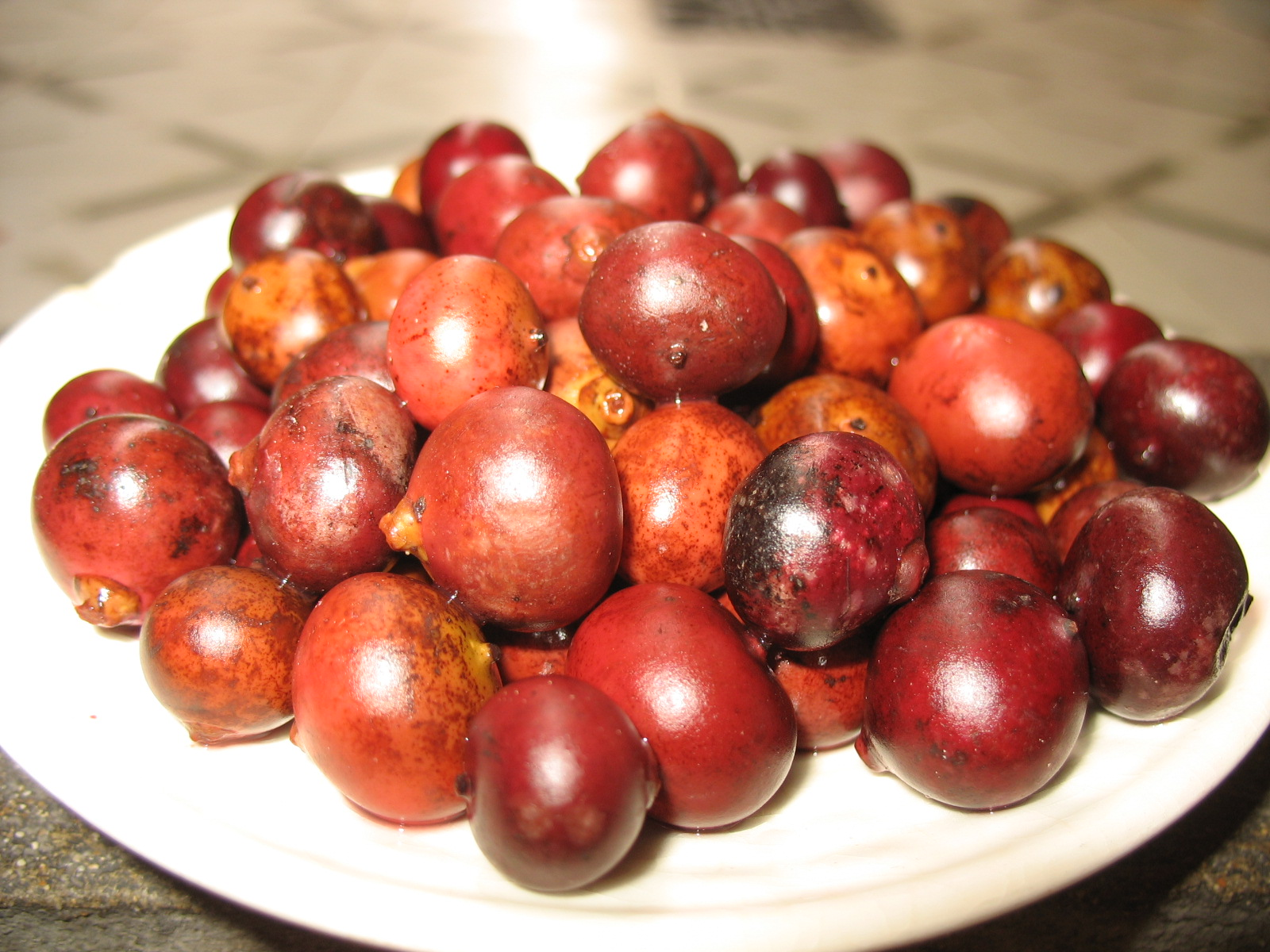
Ripe fruit

== Distribution and habitat ==
Bactris guineensis is found in seasonally dry areas including deciduous forests up to 850 m (2,800 ft) above sea level. They are also found in rainforests.

They require well-drained moist soil and some amount of protection from the sun.

== Uses ==
The stems of B. guineensis was historically used to make canes.

The fruit may be used to make juice or other beverages, candied fruit, and jams. Medicinally, it can be used as an anthelmintic or laxative, or to treat snakebites. The fruit of B. guineensis is high in fiber, potassium, vitamin C, and antioxidants, leading some researchers to consider it a candidate for the development of functional food.
