= Magnolia cubensis =

Conservation status
- Vulnerable (IUCN 3.1)

Scientific classification
- Kingdom: Plantae
- Clade: Tracheophytes
- Clade: Angiosperms
- Clade: Magnoliids
- Order: Magnoliales
- Family: Magnoliaceae
- Genus: Magnolia
- Section: Magnolia sect. Talauma
- Subsection: Magnolia subsect. Cubenses
- Species: M. cubensis

Binomial name
- Magnolia cubensis Urb.

Subspecies
- Magnolia cubensis subsp. acunae Imkhan.; Magnolia cubensis subsp. cacuminicola (Bisse) G.Klotz; Magnolia cubensis subsp. cubensis autonym; Magnolia cubensis subsp. turquinensis Imkhan.

Synonyms
- Dugandiodendron cubense (Urb.) Sima & S.G.Lu

Species of tree

Magnolia cubensis, the Cuban magnolia or cashew of the Maestra, is a tree native to the island of Cuba in the West Indies. It grows in the Sierra Maestra in the southeastern part of the island, at elevations from 700–1,800 m (2,300–5,900 ft). It is an evergreen with leathery leaves and flowers about 2.5 cm (0.98 in) in diameter. Seeds are reddish-orange.
