= Escopeteros =

Scouts in the Cuban revoloution

During the Cuban revolution, escopeteros were essential scouts and pickets from the Sierra Maestra and other mountain ranges to the plains. These scouts were tasked with the semi-continuous defense of the terrain against smaller-sized Batista patrols. They provided early warnings, maintained communication lines, safeguarded supply routes, and delivered crucial intelligence. Additionally, they frequently captured weapons that were then sent to the mainline Castro forces in the high mountains.

Raúl Castro's mission to open a second front was in reality a mission to control an area already in possession of independent (“por la libre”) escopeteros.

It can be argued that Ernesto "Che" Guevara's overseas adventures failed at least in part because of the lack of equivalent escopetero support. In the series of articles written by the staff of Escambray (circa 1988 to 2007, Che entre nosotros. Supplement to Escambray) the critical role of escopeteros is repeatedly mentioned. Yet the Argentine guerrilla leader never appears to have planned the use of these essential, if poorly armed auxiliaries, in his operations overseas.

In the 1960s a number of escopeteros joined the opposition to Fidel Castro in the Escambray Rebellion.

== Etymology ==
The original meaning of Escopeteros (shotgunners in Spanish) was those armed with a smoothbore long barrel firearm, sometimes a trabuco or blunderbuss, and has been used in this general context in histories of Spain and Latin America. It has been used to describe a pitcher in baseball, or a sniping journalist. It has also been used in the context of fighting on until victory: "El credo del escopetero".
