= Jilma Madera =

Cuban artist (1915–2000)

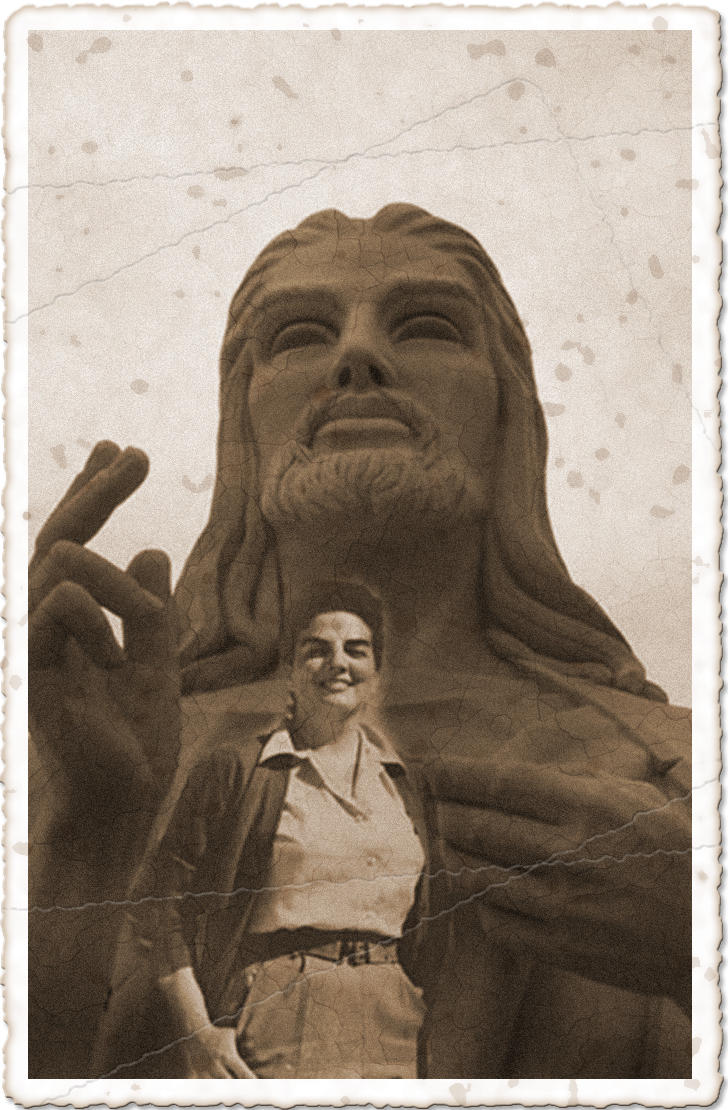
- Jilma Madera in front of the Christ of Havana statue
- Born: Lilia Jilma Madera Valiente; 18 September 1915; La Victoria, Pinar del Río, Cuba
- Died: 21 February 2000 (aged 84); Havana, Cuba
- Education: Academia Nacional de Bellas Artes San Alejandro

Lilia Jilma Madera Valiente (18 September 1915 – 21 February 2000) was a Cuban sculptor, known for the Christ of Havana and the bust of José Martí on the Pico Turquino.

== Early life and education ==
Madera was born on 18 September 1915 at the La Victoria estate in San Cristóbal.

Madera studied under Juan José Sicre at the Academia Nacional de Bellas Artes San Alejandro.

== Career ==
Her Christ of Havana statue was a commission she won in 1953 during the government of Fulgencio Batista. It was done in Carrara marble and is 20 metres (66 ft) tall and weighs 320 tons. It is composed of 67 pieces that were brought from Italy, where Madera carved the statue and was blessed there by Pope Pius XII. It was inaugurated on December 24, 1958, just two weeks before the fall of the Batista government.

She worked and made some exhibitions at New York's Sculpture Center, in USA, and exhibited other works at the City of Havana Local Council (Ayuntamiento de la Habana), the Lyceum and Lawn Tennis Club, and some painting and sculpture national exhibition halls, in Cuba.

Her bust of José Martí was done in 1953 and placed at the Pico Turquino during the centennial celebrations of Martí's birth in 1963 by Celia Sanchez.

The history of why this statue was created was told to be that Batitisa's wife prayed so hard that her husband would not be killed in the violent beginning of the revolution, that she commissioned this monument to show her gratitude for her answered prayers, however this may be an urban legend.

On 21 February 2000 Madera died in Havana, aged 84.
