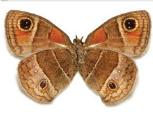

Scientific classification
- Kingdom: Animalia
- Phylum: Arthropoda
- Class: Insecta
- Order: Lepidoptera
- Family: Nymphalidae
- Genus: Calisto
- Species: C. hysius

Binomial name
- Calisto hysius (Godart, [1824])

Synonyms
- Satyrus hysius Godart, [1824]; Calisto aleucosticha Correa & Schwartz, 1986

= Calisto hysius =

Species of butterfly

Calisto hysius is a species of butterfly in the family Nymphalidae. It is endemic to Hispaniola.

The wingspan is 16.5–17.5 mm.

The larvae feed on various grasses.

== Subspecies ==
- Calisto hysius hysius
- Calisto hysius aleucosticha Correa & Schwartz, 1986
