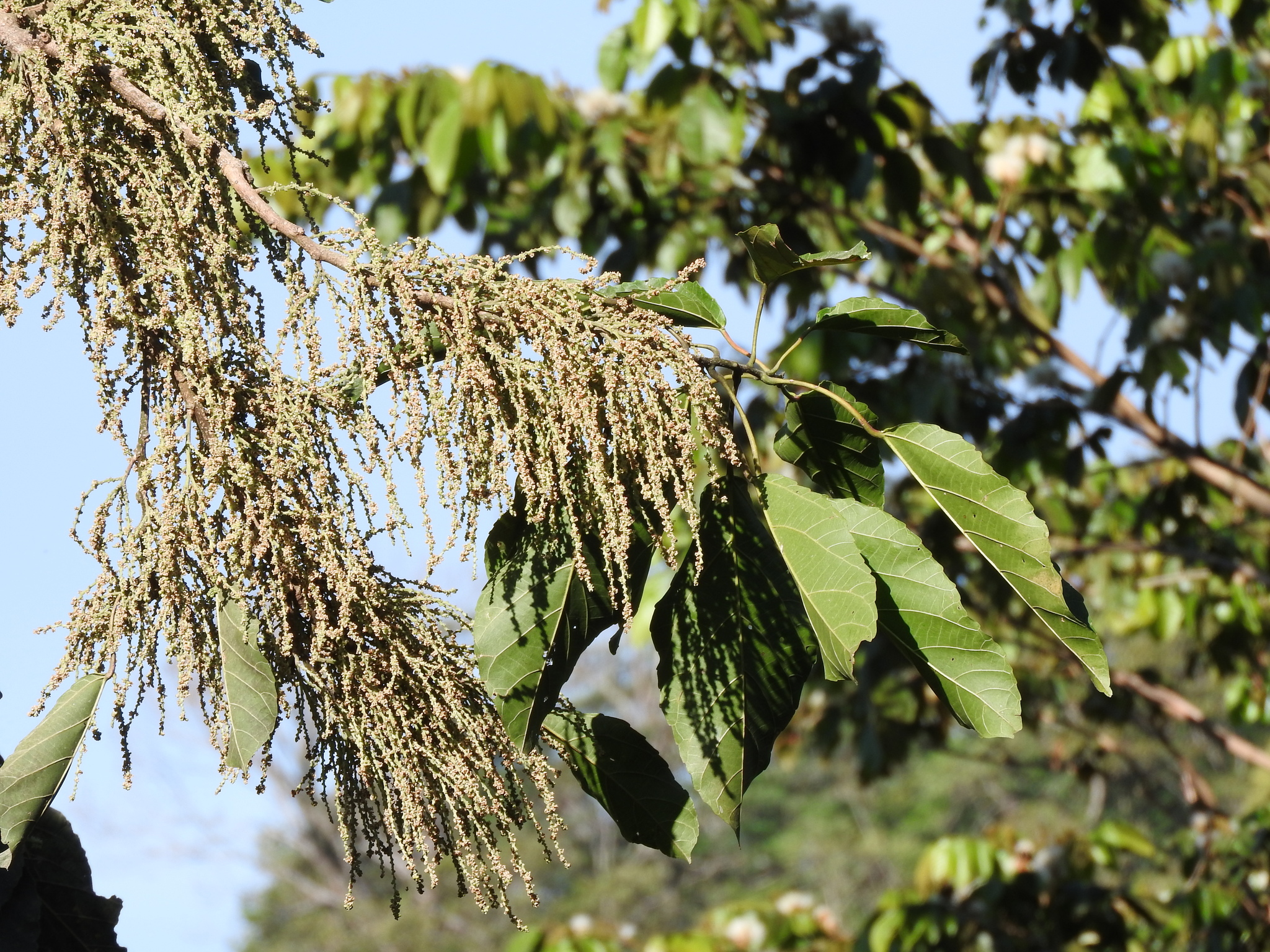
- In Mexico

Conservation status
- Least Concern (IUCN 3.1)

Scientific classification
- Kingdom: Plantae
- Clade: Tracheophytes
- Clade: Angiosperms
- Clade: Eudicots
- Clade: Rosids
- Order: Malpighiales
- Family: Euphorbiaceae
- Genus: Alchornea
- Species: A. latifolia

Binomial name
- Alchornea latifolia Sw.

= Alchornea latifolia =

Species of flowering plant

Alchornea latifolia is a species of tree in the family Euphorbiaceae. It is native to Central and South America, as well as the Caribbean, where its common names include aguacatillo, baconá and chote.

== Description ==
Alchornea latifolia is a little evergreen tree that can reach a height of approximately 20 metres (66 feet), occasionally having a trunk buttressed. The leaves have thick stalks and are ovate to elliptic, with a rounded base and a short pointed apex. They have three veins radiating from the base and are 12 to 25 centimetres (5 to 10 in) long and 6 to 18 centimetres (2 to 7 in) wide. The leaf margins have a small number of short, blunt teeth and the lower side of the leaf blade is downy. The male flowering spike is slender, up to 20 centimetres (8 in) long. The individual flowers are stalkless and have two sepals and eight stamens. The female flowering spike sometimes branches and is a similar length. The individual flowers have four ovate sepals, a two or three part ovary, and styles up to 2 centimetres (0.8 in) long. The fruits are reddish capsules about 7 millimetres (0.3 in) in diameter.

== Distribution and habitat ==
Alchornea latifolia is native to Central and South America and the West Indies. Its range extends from Southern Mexico to Panama, Cuba and the Windward Islands, and Brazil, Bolivia, Peru, Ecuador, Colombia and Venezuela. It likes moderate rainfall spread throughout most of the year and grows from sea level to an altitude of about 1,600 metres (5,200 ft).

== Uses ==
The tree produces many seeds and is a pioneer species, sprouting readily when gaps in the canopy occur. It is sometimes used for the provision of shade in coffee plantations. The branches are used for firewood and the timber for joinery, furniture, posts, crates, boxes, toys, plywood and chipboard.
