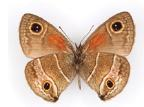

Scientific classification
- Kingdom: Animalia
- Phylum: Arthropoda
- Class: Insecta
- Order: Lepidoptera
- Family: Nymphalidae
- Genus: Calisto
- Species: C. confusa

Binomial name
- Calisto confusa Lathy, 1899

= Calisto confusa =

Species of butterfly

Calisto confusa is a butterfly of the family Nymphalidae. It is endemic to Hispaniola, where it is mainly found in the lowlands.

The larvae feed on various grasses.
