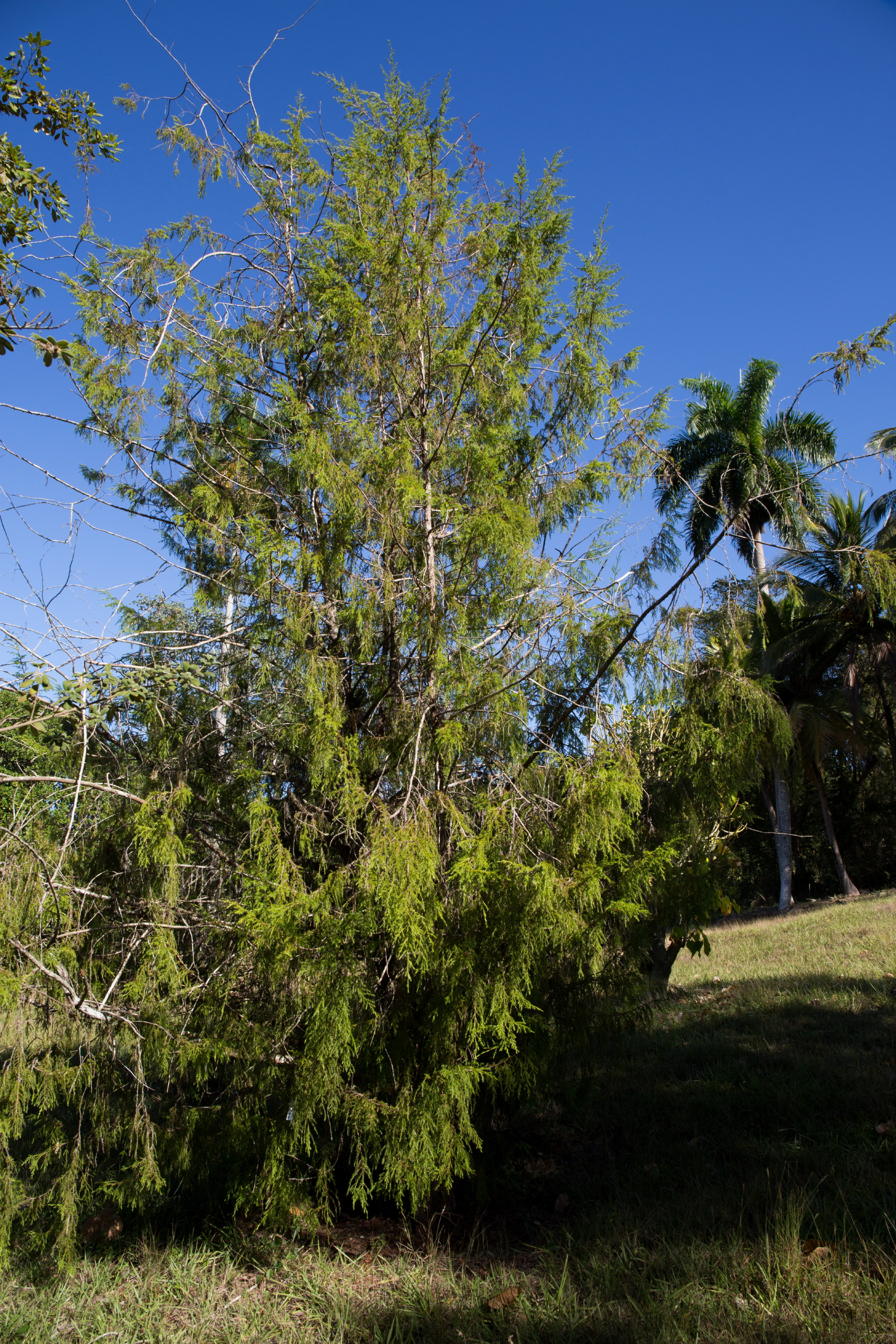
- Juniperus saxicola in the Cupaynicú Botanical Garden, Cuba

Conservation status
- Critically Endangered (IUCN 3.1)

Scientific classification
- Kingdom: Plantae
- Clade: Tracheophytes
- Clade: Gymnospermae
- Division: Pinophyta
- Class: Pinopsida
- Order: Cupressales
- Family: Cupressaceae
- Genus: Juniperus
- Species: J. saxicola

Binomial name
- Juniperus saxicola Britton & P. Wilson

= Juniperus saxicola =

Species of conifer

Juniperus saxicola is a species of conifer in the family Cupressaceae. It is found only in Cuba.

This is one of about 40 species in Juniperus section Sabina, and one of four closely related species of Caribbean junipers (the others are J. barbadensis, J. bermudiana, and J. gracilior). Both terpene data and nuclear ribosomal DNA data tie J. saxicola most closely to J. barbadensis var. barbadensis and J. barbadensis var. lucayana, the former species found in St. Lucia, the latter in Bahamas and western Cuba (Adams 2008). The relationship is close enough that this taxon could reasonably be treated at the subspecies rank, but is not as close as the relationship between the varieties of J. barbadensis. Also, since J. saxicola does not develop scale-leaved foliage, it is very different in appearance from the other Caribbean junipers.

== Description ==
Tree or shrub 3–8 m tall. Leaves always needle-like, decurrent, spreading, 5–7 mm long and ca. 1 mm wide, scale leaves never present on adult trees (see Remarks). Seed cones dark blue with bloom, subglobose to reniform, 5 mm long, 3–4 mm diameter, 2 seeds per cone (Adams 1995).
