= Cuban moist forests =

Tropical forest ecoregion

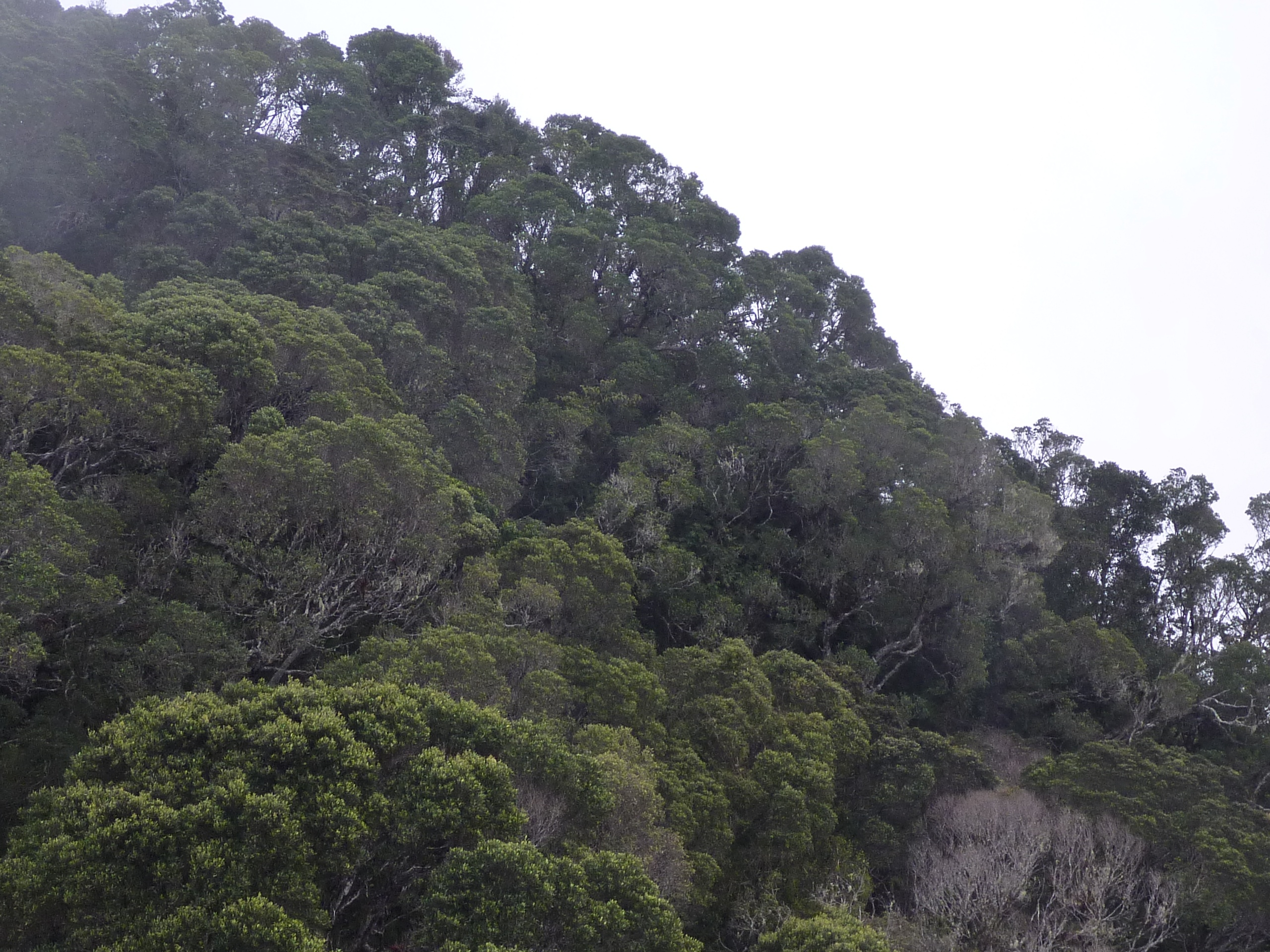
- Montane forest, Pico Turquino

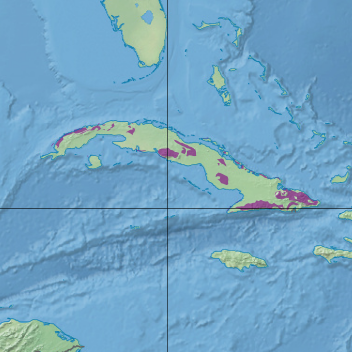
- Ecoregion (in purple)

Ecology
- Realm: Neotropical
- Biome: tropical and subtropical moist broadleaf forests
- Borders: Cuban dry forests; Cuban pine forests; Cuban wetlands; Greater Antilles mangroves
- Bird species: 251
- Mammal species: 33

Geography
- Area: 21,400 km^{2} (8,300 sq mi)
- Country: Cuba

Conservation
- Conservation status: Vulnerable
- Global 200: Greater Antillean moist forests
- Habitat loss: 64.544%
- Protected: 20.32%

The Cuban moist forests is a tropical moist broadleaf forest ecoregion that occupies 21,400 km^{2} (8,300 sq mi; 5,300,000 acres) on Cuba and Isla de la Juventud. The ecoregion receives more than 2,000 mm (79 in) of rainfall annually, and does not have a dry season. Soils are usually derived from quartz, limestone, or serpentinites. Cuban moist forests can be differentiated into lowland forests (sea level to 400 m or 1,300 ft), sub-montane forests (400–800 m or 1,300–2,600 ft), and montane forests (800–1,900 m or 2,600–6,200 ft).

== Lowland forests ==
Lowland forests are found at elevations from sea level to 400 m (1,300 ft) and reach heights of 40 m (130 ft). They consist of three tree stories. The upper story includes achiotillo (Alchornea latifolia), najesí (Carapa guianensis) and acana (Manilkara valenzuelana); the middle story has tagua-tagua (Diospyros caribaea), Ocotea floribunda, Oxandra laurifolia, Talauma minor, Terminalia spp. and Ficus spp.; and the lower story has a number of species of tree ferns, Myrtaceae and Melastomataceae. Epiphytes are abundant and varied, including Elaphoglossum crinitum, Oleandra articulata, Notopleura parasitica, and the endemic Columnea tincta. Typical palms are Calyptronoma plumeriana, Prestoea acuminata var. montana and Bactris cubensis. Heliconia species, mosses, and liverworts are also important plants.

== Sub-montane forests ==
Sub-montane forests occur elevations of 400–800 m (1,300–2,600 ft). Typical sub-montane forests consist of two tree stories and an understory; they reach a height of up to 30 m (98 ft) in height. Achiotillo (Alchornea latifolia), júcare amarillo (Terminalia tetraphylla), purío prieto (Guatteria blainii), Licaria triandra, roble macho (Tabebuia hypoleuca) and Zanthoxylum caribaeum subsp. caribaeum grow in the upper story. Cuaba de la maestra (Amyris lineata), cuajaní (Prunus myrtifolia), Ditta myricoides, Laplacea spp., Oxandra laurifolia, Ocotea spp., Myrsine coriacea subsp. coriacea, and Podocarpus species can be found in the lower story. Tree ferns, Myrtaceae and Melastomataceae and Rubiaceae flourish in the understory.

Sub-montane forests growing in ultisols reach a height of 20 m (66 ft) and have two stories with trees such as Calophyllum utile, Guatteria blainii, Magnolia cristalensis, roble de hoja ancha (Tabebuia dubia), Zanthoxylum rhodoxylon subsp. cubense, and Bactris cubensis.

== Montane forests ==
Montane forests are found at elevations of 800–1,900 m (2,600–6,200 ft). These forests consist of two arboreal stories and reach a height of 20 m (66 ft). The upper story is dominated by barril (Cyrilla racemiflora), marañon de la Maestra (Magnolia cubensis), Persea hypoleuca, and Gordonia angustifolia. The lower story consists of Cleyera nimanimae, Freziera grisebachii, Haenianthus salicifolius, Lyonia species, Torralbasia cuneifolia, and enebro (Juniperus saxicola). Epiphytes, mosses, ferns, terrestrial orchids, and clubmosses are abundant.

== Fauna ==
Birds of Cuba's moist forests include the Cuban tody (Todus multicolor), bee hummingbird (Mellisuga helenae), Cuban trogon (Priotelus temnurus), Cuban solitaire (Myadestes elisabeth), Cuban kite (Chondrohierax wilsonii), red-legged honeycreeper (Cyanerpes cyaneus), Cuban parakeet (Aratinga euops), Stygian owl (Asio stygius) and Gundlach's hawk (Accipiter gundlachi). The rare Cuban solenodon (Atopogale cubana), a small mammal, is endemic to the eastern montane forests along the Nipe-Sagua-Baracoa mountain range. Other notable mammals include the hutias, 4-5 species of small to medium-sized, climbing rodents related to the guinea pig.

== See also ==
- Cuban dry forests
- Cuban pine forests
- List of ecoregions in Cuba
