= Pico Turquino =

Mountain in Cuba

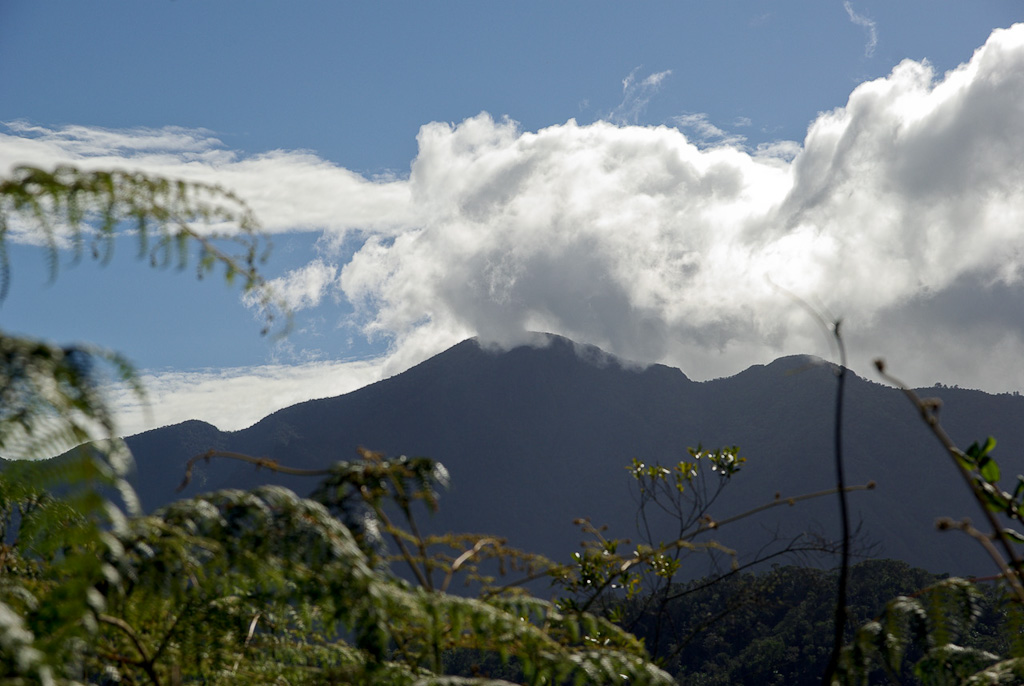

Highest point
- Elevation: 1,974 m (6,476 ft)
- Prominence: 1,974 m (6,476 ft)
- Listing: North America isolated peaks 94th; Ultra prominent peak; Ribu; Country high point
- Coordinates: 19°59′22″N 76°50′09″W

Naming
- English translation: Turquino Peak
- Language of name: Spanish

Geography
- Location within Cuba
- Location: Cuba
- Parent range: Sierra Maestra

Pico Turquino (Spanish pronunciation: [ˌpi.ko tuɾˈki.no]), sometimes erroneously spelled as Pico Torquino, is the highest point in Cuba. It is located in the southeast part of the island, in the Sierra Maestra mountain range in the municipality of Guamá, Santiago de Cuba Province. It is the only place in Cuba where snowfall has been officially recorded, which last fell in February 1900.

== Etymology ==
The name is believed to be a corruption of the phrase for "turquoise peak" (Spanish: turquesa), so-named for its apparent blue hues seen by the heights in certain views.

== History ==
The peak was first mentioned (under the name "Tarquino") on a map drawn by Geert de Kremer in the late 16th century. The first documented ascent of the peak was in 1860 by Fred W. Ramsden, a twenty-year-old Englishman then living in Santiago de Cuba. The climb was not widely publicized at the time. In 1915 the Swedish botanist Erik Leonard Ekman climbed the mountain and speculated that he was probably the first person to have done so. The following year, in response, Ramsden's son published a letter his father had written to his own mother describing the original ascent.

A bust of José Martí sculpted by Jilma Madera was placed on the peak in 1953 to celebrate his centenary.

Fidel Castro and his soldiers summited the peak in 1957 during their insurgency. According to Che Guevara, Castro's second-in-command, the mountain had an "almost mystical significance" to the revolutionaries, chiefly due to it being the highest point in Cuba.

== Conservation ==
Turquino National Park is established on a 229.38 km^{2} (88.56 sq mi) area around the peak.

== See also ==
- Uvero
