= Johannes Bisse =

Johannes Bisse (1935–1984) was a Cuban botanist, born in Germany in 1935 and arrived in Cuba in 1966. He received his doctorate from the Friedrich Schiller University of Jena. He was the founder and first director of the Cuban National Botanic Garden in Havana.

He died in an automobile accident near the garden, shortly after its inauguration. The Encuentro de Botánica "Johannes Bisse in Memoriam", a botanical academic conference, is held every two years in Camagüey, Cuba in honor of his contributions on the field.

== Bibliography ==
- Bisse, Johannes (1988). Arboles de Cuba. Havana: Editorial Científico-Técnico. p. 384.
