= Sierra Maestra =

Mountain range of Cuba

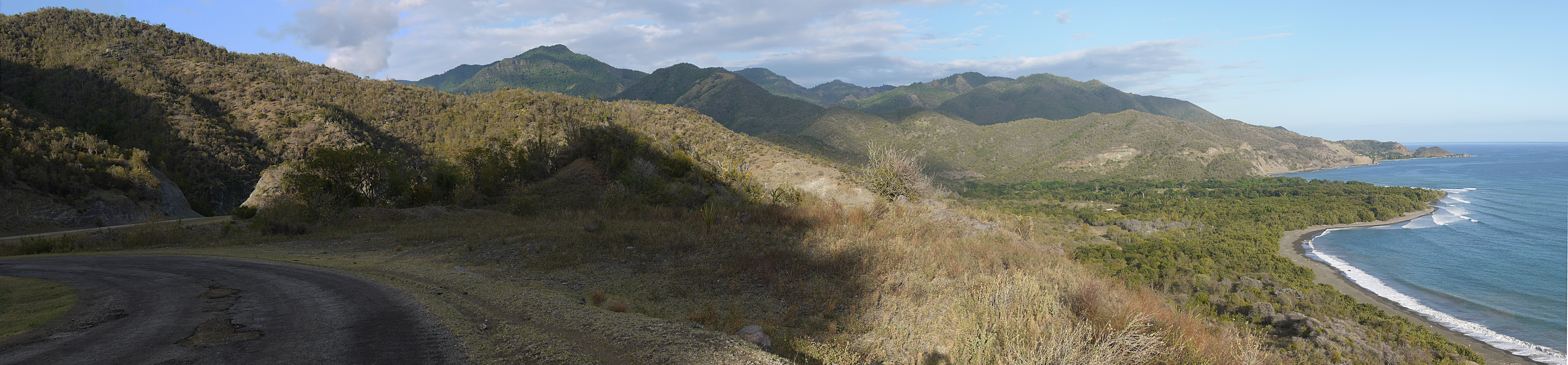
- Sierra Maestra near the boundary between Granma and Santiago de Cuba provinces.

Highest point
- Peak: Pico Turquino
- Elevation: 1,974 m (6,476 ft)
- Coordinates: 19°59′22″N 76°50′09″W

Dimensions
- Length: 240 km (150 mi)
- Width: 30 km (19 mi)

Geography
- Location within Cuba
- Country: Cuba
- Provinces: Granma; Santiago de Cuba
- Range coordinates: 20°0′0″N 76°45′0″W

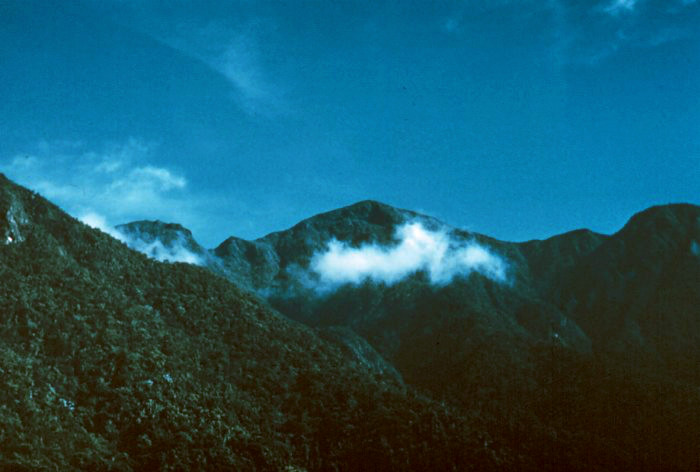
Pico Turquino in the Sierra Maestra, Cuba's highest mountain.

The Sierra Maestra is a mountain range that runs westward across the south of the old Oriente Province in southeast Cuba, rising abruptly from the coast. The range falls mainly within the Santiago de Cuba and in Granma Provinces. Some view it as a series of connecting ranges (Vela, Santa Catalina, Quemado Grande, Daña Mariana), which join with others to the west. At 1,974 m (~6,500 ft), Pico Turquino is the range's – and the country's – highest point. The area is rich in minerals, especially copper, manganese, chromium, and iron.

== History ==
The Sierra Maestra has a long history of guerrilla warfare, starting with the resistance of the Taínos under Guamá (died 1532), the Cimarrón Neo-Taíno nations escaped slave cultures, the Ten Years' War (1868–1878) and the Cuban War of Independence (1895–1898), and various minor conflicts such as the Race War of 1912, and the uprisings of Antonio Guiteras (died 1935) against Gerardo Machado (President of Cuba from 1925 to 1933) and Fulgencio Batista (President 1940–1944 and 1952–1959). After Fidel Castro returned to Cuba in 1956 from exile in Mexico, he and the few other survivors from the failed 1953 attack on Moncada Barracks hid in the Sierra Maestra. There they succeeded in expanding their 26th of July Movement, starting a revolution throughout the region. They built up guerrilla columns, and in collaboration with other groups in the central provinces, Escopeteros on the foot-hills and plains, and the urban resistance, eventually overthrew Batista on 1 January 1959.

== Biodiversity ==
Calls of the Cuban subspecies of the ivory-billed woodpecker, now possibly extinct, were reported but not confirmed in the Sierra Maestra in 1998; it remains the most likely habitat to contain a population of the species. The mountain range also hosts a population of wintering Bicknell's thrushes.

The isolation of the range's high peaks has also driven the evolution of endemic amphibians. In 2017, a new species of frog, Eleutherodactylus cattus, was described from the Sierra del Cobre mountains within the massif, having previously been confused with the related species Eleutherodactylus glamyrus.

== See also ==
- Geography of Cuba
- Turquino National Park
