= Fidel (2002 film) =

- DVD cover
- Genre: Biographical drama
- Based on: Guerilla Prince by Georgie Anne Geyer; Fidel Castro by Robert E. Quirk
- Screenplay by: Stephen Tolkin
- Directed by: David Attwood
- Starring: Víctor Huggo Martin; Gael García Bernal; Patricia Velásquez; Cecilia Suárez; Manuel Sevilla; Maurice Compte
- Music by: John Altman
- Country of origin: United States
- Original language: English

Production
- Executive producer: David V. Picker
- Producers: Kevin Cooper; Jose Ludlow
- Cinematography: Checco Varese
- Editor: Milton Moses Ginsberg
- Running time: 200 minutes (2 parts)
- Production companies: Showtime Networks; RTL Television

Original release
- Network: Showtime
- Release: January 27 – January 28, 2002

Fidel, titled onscreen as ¡Fidel!, is a 2002 American biographical drama television film directed by David Attwood about the Cuban Revolution and political career of Fidel Castro, played by Víctor Huggo Martin. Gael García Bernal, Patricia Velásquez, Cecilia Suárez, Manuel Sevilla, and Maurice Compte also star. The screenplay by Stephen Tolkin is based on two biographies of Castro: Guerilla Prince: The Untold Story of Fidel Castro (1991) by Georgie Anne Geyer, and Fidel Castro (1993) by Robert E. Quirk. The film aired on Showtime in two parts, on January 27 and 28, 2002. The total duration of the film is 200 minutes, but the video version is shorter. García Bernal would reprise his role as Che Guevara in the 2004 feature film The Motorcycle Diaries.

== Background ==
The film is almost documentary in its portrayal of facts. It claims to be based strongly on facts, apart from some adaptations like merging various characters into one.

After two hours, the film changes dramatically: the first two hours are centered on the six years before the fall of Batista's dictatorship. The last hour is about the takeover of the country and the subsequent 40 years of the Cuban Revolution.

In the first two hours of story, Castro regularly distances himself from Communism and Communists, but after the Bay of Pigs invasion, the film suggests that Castro had always aspired to create a Marxist-Leninist State.

== Cast ==
- Víctor Huggo Martin as Fidel Castro
  - Honorato Magaloni as aged Fidel Castro
- Gael García Bernal as Che Guevara
- Patricia Velásquez as Mirta Díaz-Balart
- Cecilia Suárez as Celia Sánchez
- Manuel Sevilla as Abel Santamaría
- Maurice Compte as Raúl Castro
- Margarita Rosa de Francisco as Naty Revuelta
- Enrique Arce as Rafael
- José María Yazpik as Camilo Cienfuegos
- Alejandra Gollas as Haydée Santamaría
- Ernesto Godoy as Huber Matos
- Guillermo Díaz as Universo Sánchez
- Tony Plana as Gen. Fulgencio Batista
- Mel Rodriguez as Calixto Morales
- Bobby Plasencia as Faustino Pérez
- Ismael 'East' Carlo as Eduardo Chibás
- Ken Jenkins as Herbert Matthews
- Adrián Makala as Juan Almeida
- Pedro Mira as Ramiro Valdés
- Juan Ignacio Aranda as Alberto Bayo
- Roger Cudney as Ambassador Butler
- Diego Luna as Renato Guitart
- Carmen Zapata as old woman
- George Lopez as Chucho Osorio

== Production ==
Filming took place in Mexico and the Dominican Republic.

== Home media ==
In Australia the full-length feature (204 minutes) was released on DVD by Showtime as Fidel & Che.
