= Efigenio Ameijeiras =

Cuban military commander (1931–2020)

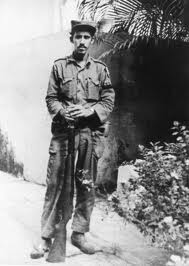
Efigenio Ameijeiras in 1958

Efigenio Ameijeiras Delgado (September 21, 1931 – February 10, 2020) was a Cuban military commander affiliated with Fidel Castro from the 1950s. Son of Manuel Ameijeiras Fontelo, a native of Pontevedra (Spain) and the Cuban María de las Angustias Delgado Romo, from Corral Falso, in Matanzas. At the age of four, his father disappeared, so his mother had to take care of her children alone.

== Biography ==
Ameijeiras was born in September 1931. A self-declared anti-communist, he was one of the band of Castro's active guerrillas that became known as the 26th of July Movement, named after the raid on the Moncada Barracks on 26 July 1953, though he is not mentioned as one of the participants. One of his brothers, Juan Manuel Ameijeiras, was one of the assailants at the Moncada Barracks and was assassinated shortly after. He was the founder of the first clandestine cell of the July 26 Movement. Granma Expeditionary, Second Chief of the Frank Pais Front and Commander of the Revolution. Himself is reported to have been gaoled in 1955 on 'moral charges', with an alias of 'Tomeguin'. In December 1956, he was among 82 of Castro's guerrillas on board the yacht Granma that sailed from Tuxpan, Mexico to Punta de las Coloradas, in Oriente Province, Cuba. He fought with the guerillas in the Sierra Maestra, and took part in an attack on El Uvero barracks on 28 May 1957. In 1958 he served as the leader of Company B of the guerrillas in Guantanamo Province.

After the revolution on 1 January 1959, he served as the Head of the National Revolutionary Police. On 15 April 1961, in response to the air attacks by CIA/Brigade 2506 Douglas B-26 Invader aircraft on Cuban airfields, he led the round-up and detention and execution of thousands of suspected opponents to the Cuban government.

During the Bay of Pigs Invasion, on 19 April 1961, he commanded a battalion of about 200 police and militia moving south towards Giron, that was attacked by Brigade B-26s. His narratives of fighting and arrival at Playa Giron are widely quoted.

He later served in the Cuban Army with the ranks of Major General and Brigadier General. From 1963-64 he commanded the Cuban contingent sent to aid Algeria during its border war with Morocco. In 1966 he was expelled from the new Communist Party of Cuba (PCC), for alleged 'moral offences'.

Graduated in History from the University of Havana, he was the author of the trilogy Beyond us (together with the volumes La clandestinidad and La Sierra Maestra). He was awarded the title of Hero of the Republic of Cuba in 2001.

He died of sepsis in February 2020 at the age of 88. After the cremation, his ashes were exposed on February 11 in the Veterans Pantheon of the Colon Cemetery, Havana.

== Bibliography ==
- Ameijeiras, Efigenio. Beyond Us (trilogy, along with volumes Secrecy and The Sierra Maestra)
- Escalante, Fabian. 1993. Cuba: La guerra secreta de la CIA.(in Spanish).
- Escalante, Fabian. 1995. The Secret War: CIA Covert Operations Against Cuba, 1959-1962. Translation of "La guerra secreta de la CIA" (1993) by Maxine Shaw and edited by Mirta Muniz. Melbourne, Australia: Ocean Press. ISBN 1-875284-86-9
- Franqui, Carlos. 1984. Family Portrait with Fidel. 1985 edition Random House First Vintage Books, New York. ISBN 0-394-72620-0
- Rodriguez, Juan Carlos. 1999. Bay of Pigs and the CIA. Ocean Press Melbourne. ISBN 1-875284-98-2 ISBN 9781875284986
- Thomas, Hugh. 1971, 1986. The Cuban Revolution. Weidenfeld and Nicolson. London. (Shortened version of Cuba: The Pursuit of Freedom, includes all history 1952-1970) ISBN 0-297-79037-4 ISBN 0-297-78954-6
