= Battle of La Plata (1957) =

1957 guerrilla attack against an outpost of the Cuban Army

- Part of Cuban Revolution
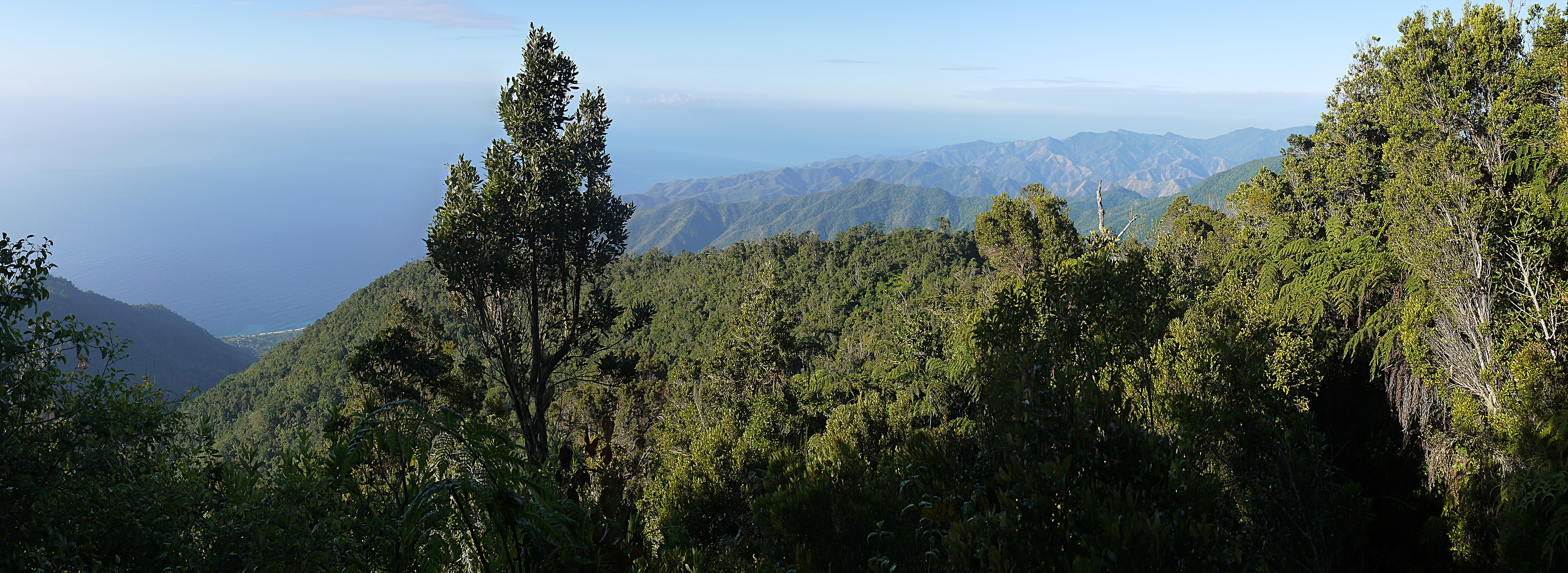
- The Sierra Maestra, near the coast
Date	January 17, 1957
Location	La Plata, Cuba 19°55′08″N 76°54′06″W
Result	Rebel victory

Belligerents
26th of July Movement	Cuban National Army

Commanders and leaders
Fidel Castro	

Strength
22	15

Casualties and losses
None	2 killed 5 wounded 3 captured

The Battle of La Plata was a battle fought on January 17, 1957, in the coastal village of La Plata in the Sierra Maestra mountain range of Cuba during the Cuban Revolution. It is notable as the first battle of the revolution following the Landing of the Granma which was a success for the rebels, who had previously suffered a heavy defeat at the Battle of Alegría de Pío in which the vast majority of their forces had been killed, wounded or captured.

== Background ==
On December 2, 1956, 82 rebels of the July 26th Movement, a Cuban revolutionary organization headed by Fidel Castro, whose goal was to topple the military dictatorship of Fulgencio Batista, landed on the coast of southern Cuba near Playa Las Coloradas in Niquero Municipality on a small yacht called the "Granma". After 3 days trekking through the forests on the way to the Sierra Maestra in order to wage a guerilla campaign, their local guide had abandoned them and told nearby army patrols of the location of the guerillas. They were soon ambushed by the military at the small village Alegría de Pío, which severely crippled the rebels, with most of the 82 men having been killed. Though the survivors of the ambush managed to regroup in the following weeks, only 15 of the former 82 men had survived the ambush, and they lacked necessities such as weapons, equipment, ammunition, food and medicine. In addition to this, in both the Cuban and international media, it was widely reported that the rebellion had been crushed and Fidel Castro had been killed.

== Prelude ==
By January 14, the rebels had trekked deep into the Sierra Maestra and had chosen to stop at the Magdalena River, in order to train what was left of their band and to maintain hygenie which they had abandoned in the days prior. Following this, they climbed a small mountain range after which they had arrived at the La Plata River, where the settlement and barracks of La Plata is located on the Caribbean Sea along the river. Walking along a narrow path in the bush which was cleared by a local peasant named Melquiades Elías, they had captured two peasants who turned out to be relatives of their guide Eutimio Guerra, after which one was released while the other was kept as a precautionary measure. On January 15, they had arrived in the vicinity of the La Plata barracks, and for the next two days they proceeded to do surveillance on the barracks in preparation for their attack. On the 16th, they crossed the La Plata river and took two peasants hostage, of which one had been an informant, who told the rebels that there were roughly 15 soldiers stationed at the barracks. In addition, they told them that one of the most infamous foremen and military informants in the region, Chicho Osorio, would soon be passing along the road. Osorio was widely disliked by the peasants in the surrounding region due to his brutality towards the locals. To the rebels, killing Osorio would help gain the trust of the locals, as at the time they were not yet supportive and indifferent to the revolution.

Later, Osorio appeared on the road, with an Afro-Cuban boy in tow and intoxicated from alcohol. The rebels then tricked Osorio into thinking that they were members of the Cuban Rural Guard, after which Osorio unknowingly gave up critical information to the rebels, such as the names of many in the area who were both sympathetic and unsympathetic to the rebels, in addition to incriminating evidence that he had beaten peasants due to perceived disrespect, and that he had killed two men, after which he was pardoned by Batista. Fidel had asked Osorio what he would do to him had he captured him, after which Osorio, not knowing that he was speaking to Fidel, gestured that he would kill him. He then showed the rebels his boots, which he had taken from an M-26 member he had captured and killed from the Granma landing. Fidel suggested to Osorio that they should surprise the soldiers at the barracks in order to show them that they were poorly prepared and not properly doing their duty, to which Osorio agreed.

After crossing the river once again to the barracks, Fidel instructed Osorio that he had to be bound according to military regulations, to which Osorio again agreed, unknowingly making him a true prisoner. After some scouting, the rebels had located the guards, proving the informant's information to be correct. The rebels then planned to attack the barracks, with Camilo Cienfuegos and two others attacking the barracks from the extreme right, Fidel, Che Guevara and four others to attack from the center, and Raúl Castro, Juan Almeida and the rest of the rebels attacking from the left.

== The battle ==
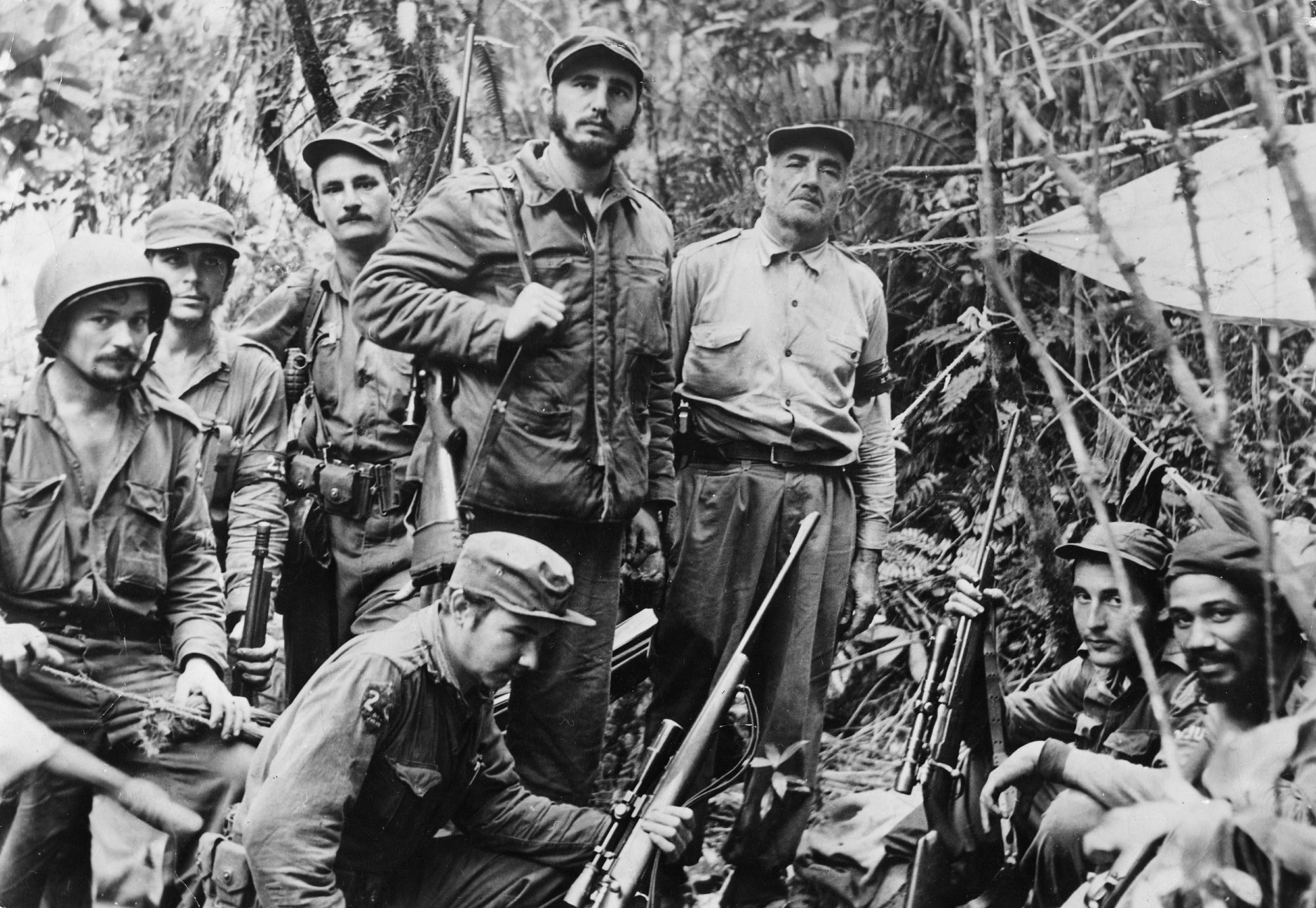
Fidel Castro and his men in the Sierra Maestra

After arriving within 40 meters of the barracks, Fidel opened fire with two bursts of machine gun fire at 2:40 in the morning, followed by the rest of the guerillas. At this moment, Osorio was then promptly executed by Almeida, and the rebels began calling on the soldiers to surrender. However, the guards had resisted more than expected, and each time the rebels demanded they surrender, the sergeant in command of the barracks responded with M1 rifle fire. Attempting to dislodge them from their positions, the rebels threw grenades and dynamite at the soldiers, however to little effect. After this, Guevara along with Luis Crespo managed to get close to an adjacent building, after which they set it on fire. On lighting the building, they discovered that it was actually a coconut warehouse, however, the burning had intimidated the soldiers guarding the barracks, after which soldiers began to flee.

One soldier had accidentally run into Crespo in attempting to escape, after which he was shot and wounded, and taken prisoner. In the midst of this, the commanding sergeant fled the barracks. With the sergeant gone and the remaining soldiers demoralized and intimidated, the soldiers began to suffer intense casualties from the rebels. After Cienfuegos had entered the barracks, the remaining soldiers then promptly surrendered.

After the shooting had stopped, the rebels captured eight Springfield rifles, a Thompson submachine gun, and a thousand rounds of ammunition, replenishing the roughly 500 rounds the rebels used in the battle. In addition to this, cartridge belts, knives, food, clothing and fuel were also captured. Two soldiers had been killed, five had been wounded, of which three were severely wounded, and three had been taken prisoner, with the rest having escaped. In turn, the rebels had not sustained any casualties. Castro decided to free the captured and wounded soldiers and left the medicine from the barracks to them, after which the civilians held as prisoners in the barracks were freed, the barracks were burned, and the rebels headed for Palma Mocha at 4:30 in the morning, a location in the mountains, at which they arrived at the dawn of the day.

== Aftermath ==
In the aftermath of the battle, the three severely wounded soldiers had died from their injuries. Later, one of the soldiers from the burned barracks decided to join the rebels, and would eventually reach the rank of lieutenant by the end of the revolution. Before the battle had taken place, a corporal and a foreman at Palma Mocha informed the residents of the village that the town would be bombed due to rebel activities and told to flee. This was in reality a ruse, with the goal of driving the villagers from their land so that their land could be confiscated. However, once the attack at La Plata occurred, this became a reality, with the village having been bombed by the time the rebels arrived in the morning of the 17th, with the villagers having fled.

The battle itself had many reverberations across Cuba, despite its small size. Up to this point, many had believed that the rebels had been crushed and entirely defeated, but the battle at the La Plata barracks and the subsequent Battle of Arroyo del Infierno five days later proved to the country that this was not the case. It also provided the rebels with much needed weapons, ammunition, food and equipment which they lacked following the Granma landing the month prior, and replenished morale lost from the disasters of the previous month.
