= Melba Hernández =

Cuban politician

Melba Hernandez
- Born: 28 July 1921; Cruces, Las Villas
- Died: 9 March 2014 (aged 92); Havana, Cuba
- Occupations: politician and diplomat

Melba Hernández Rodríguez del Rey (28 July 1921 – 9 March 2014) was a Cuban politician and diplomat. She served as the Cuban Ambassador to Vietnam and to Cambodia.

== Life ==
Born in Cruces, Las Villas, Hernández was the only child of mulatto conservative parents who resided in a modern third-floor apartment on Jovellar Street in Vedado district of Havana. Her parents were involved in Cuba’s war for independence and inculcated principles of revolutionary advocacy in her. She graduated from the University of Havana School of Law in 1943. Hernández worked as a Customs attorney for the Carlos Prio government. As an attorney, Melba represented some clients who were exploited peasants and dismissed workers. She was one of the two women (the other being Haydée Santamaría Cuadrado) involved in the 1953 Moncada Barracks assault. Although she had been practicing law for a decade, during the Moncada trial she chose not to defend herself, as Fidel Castro did, and was instead represented by Jorge Paglieri Cardero. She was sentenced to 7 months in prison. She was later declared "Heroina del Moncada". In the early 1960s, she was in charge of women's prisons in Cuba.

She had been a Deputy in the National Assembly of People’s Power since 1993 (she previously served from 1976 to 1986) representing the municipality of 10 de Octubre. Hernández had been a member of the Central Committee of the Communist Party of Cuba since 1986. She had also served as the Secretary General of OSPAAAL (Organization of Solidarity of the People of Asia, Africa & Latin America).

She was married to Jesús Montané Oropesa, a top aide to Fidel Castro, until his death in 1999.

She died of complications from diabetes on 9 March 2014.

== Cuban Revolution ==
Melba Hernandez was an active member of the Cuban revolution. She was one of the best-known women that fought alongside Fidel Castro in the Cuban Revolutionary war against Fulgencio Batista. Melba met Fidel in 1952 after going to a demonstration at a grave of a worker who was killed by Batista’s thugs, there she met Abel Santamaría who later introduced them. Melba was involved with an underground organization led by Fidel Castro before the July 26th attack and joined the revolution because she was attracted to the insurrection against President Fulgencio Batista. She later became one of the four staff members of Fidel Castro.

=== 26 of July Movement ===
Melba Hernandez was one of the women who participated in the 26th of July Movement, a movement named after the Moncada Barrack attack. She helped the movement by obtaining 100 soldiers' uniform and stitching different ranks on them. The uniforms were used to attack the Moncada Barracks. As a woman, Melba had to fight to be included in the attack, she took a stand on being a part of the assault as she played a part in the group. Fidel Castro, the leader of the attack, was against women fighting in the attack, but after Melba’s request to be included, a settlement was made in which she and Haydée Santamaria would act as nurses in the assault. She rode into the fight with one of the columns headed to take over the barracks. She was able to make it to the barracks and was a part of a group that gained control of a hospital. During the charge, Melba and Haydee stood by waiting to provide medical assistance to fellow soldiers. Ultimately the attack failed and Fidel Castro, Melba Hernandez, Haydée Santamaria, and the remaining survivors of the attack were arrested. After being arrested Melba and others who were involved in the July 26 assault were interrogated and tortured to release information, Melba however remained silent. The Batista government sentenced Fidel Castro to 15 years in prison since he was the leader of the attack, and Melba and Haydée were sentenced to 7 months in prison.

Melba and Haydée were sentenced to the National Prison for Women, in Guanajay and after 5 months in prison Melba and Haydée were released. Melba and Haydée, being released months before the men who were involved with the assault, held support rallies for their comrades still in jail. Melba kept in contact with Fidel Castro while he was in jail, and she got orders of how to run the 26 of July Movement. Melba also then helped publish Castro's "History Will Absolve Me" speech. "History Will Absolve Me" was a speech that Fidel Castro wrote while in prison that talk about his will and future of Cuba. After Castro was released in 1955, they rejoin forces in Mexico, where they kept planning for the guerrilla army and the Cuban Revolution. In Mexico, Melba made contact with assailants who were in exile there following the Moncada Barrack assault, and she helped with the preparations for the voyage of the ship Granma. She then returned to Cuba where she joined a rebel army in the ranks of “Mario Muñoz Monroy” Third Front, ran by Juan Almeida Bosque. Later, Melba Hernández was given the name "Heroine of the Cuban Revolution" for her actions during the Cuban Revolutionary war.

== After the Cuban Revolution ==
Melba Hernandez took a role in the new government run by Fidel Castro. She became the head of the Cuban Committee in Solidarity with Vietnam in the 1960s to 1970s. She was the ambassador to Vietnam and Cambodia in the 1980s. She was the vice president of the Anti-Imperialist Tribunal of Our America, the secretary general of Organization in Solidarity with the People of Asia, Africa, and Latin America (OSPAAL), director of the Communist Party's Center for Asian Studios, and deputy in Cuba's National Assembly between 1976 and 1986 and was re-elected in 1993.

== Sources ==
- Deltona Beach Morning Journal; Plead In; 30 September 1953
- PBS; American Experience | Fidel Castro | People & Events; 21 December 2004
