= Carlos Franqui =

Cuban writer and activist (1921–2010)

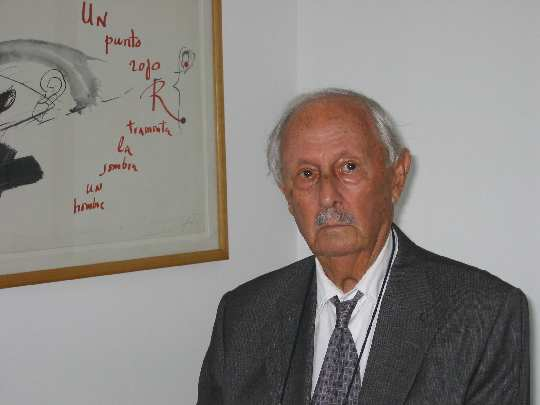
- Carlos Franqui, 2006 in front of a painting with one of his poems
- Born: December 4, 1921; Cifuentes, Cuba
- Died: April 16, 2010 (aged 88); San Juan, Puerto Rico
- Organization(s): Revolución, Radio Rebelde
- Movement: 26th of July Movement

Carlos Franqui (December 4, 1921 – April 16, 2010) was a Cuban writer, poet, journalist, art critic, and political activist. After the Fulgencio Batista coup in 1952, he became involved with the 26th of July Movement which was headed by Fidel Castro. Upon the success of the Cuban Revolution in 1959, he was placed in charge of the rebellion's newspaper Revolución, which became an official government publication. When he came to have political differences with the regime, he left Cuba with his family. In 1968 he broke with the Cuban government when he signed a letter condemning the Soviet invasion of Czechoslovakia. He became a vocal critic of the Castro government, writing frequently until his death on April 16, 2010.

== Early years ==
Born in a cane field, he entered a vocational school, where he joined the Communist Party of Cuba. He gave up the opportunity to enter the University of Havana to become a professional organizer for the party at the age of 20. After successfully organizing the party in several small towns, he left the organization and became an unaffiliated leftist.

He turned to journalism to make a living and became involved in several literary and artistic movements. He developed friendships with Cuban artists, including writer Guillermo Cabrera Infante and painter Wifredo Lam.

== Role in the Cuban revolution ==
After the Fulgencio Batista coup in 1952, he became involved with the 26th of July Movement headed by Fidel Castro. He co-edited the underground newspaper Revolución in Havana, taking responsibility for public information. One article in particular reported the landing of the Granma and confirmed that Castro was safe in the Sierra Maestra. For this he was jailed and tortured by the police. Upon his release, he went into exile first in Mexico and then in Florida, but was soon drafted by Castro into the Sierra Maestra to continue work on Revolución and also on Radio Rebelde, the guerilla movement's clandestine radio station.

Upon the success of the Cuban Revolution in 1959, he was placed in charge of Revolución, which became an official organ of the government. During his tenure as editor, he maintained a degree of independence from the official line and emphasized the arts and literature, launching the literary supplement Lunes de Revolución, which was directed by Guillermo Cabrera Infante and featured high quality work by Cuban and international authors. His position allowed him to travel extensively outside of Cuba. During his European travels, he met artists and intellectuals, including Pablo Picasso, Miró, Calder, Jean-Paul Sartre, Simone de Beauvoir, and Julio Cortázar. A significant number of these artists traveled to Cuba. One of the most memorable visits was that of Sartre and Simone de Beauvoir.

Franqui had frequent disagreements with the government, which eventually led to his resignation from Revolución in 1963. The paper was closed a few months later. After his resignation, Franqui dedicated himself to art projects. In 1967 he organized the Salón de Mayo exhibit in Havana, where many of the world's leading artists were represented.

== Exile from Cuba ==
He continued to have problems with the Cuban government. He was allowed to leave Cuba with his family–an émigré rather than an exile–and settled in Italy where he worked as an unpaid cultural representative of Cuba. In 1968, he officially broke with the Cuban government when he signed a letter condemning the Soviet invasion of Czechoslovakia. Many Cuban exiles shunned Franqui because of the active role he had played in the Cuban revolution.

Now definitively an exile, his literary production increased. Franqui authored several accounts of the Cuban Revolution, including, El Libro de los Doce (The Book about the Twelve) and Diario de la Revolución Cubana (The Diary of the Cuban Revolution). He collaborated with Joan Miró, Antoni Tàpies, Alexander Calder, and others on graphic arts publications as well as other works about contemporary art, some of which he edited in Italian under pen names. He wrote several books of poetry as well.

He continued to campaign against repression in Cuba and other countries. He was officially branded a traitor by the Cuban government, which accused him of having ties to the U.S. Central Intelligence Agency. After breaking relations with Cuba the Cuban government began airbrushing Franqui's image from photographs that documented the revolution's early years.

Franqui responded with a poem:

I discover my photographic death.
Do I exist?
I am a little black,
I am a little white,
I am a little shit,
On Fidel's vest.

In the early 1990s, he moved to Puerto Rico, where he lived in semi-retirement with his art collection from his years in Cuba and Europe. His artwork collection included works from Pablo Picasso, Joan Miro, Andy Warhol, and Frida Kahlo among others. In 1996, he founded Carta de Cuba, a quarterly journal featuring work produced in Cuba by independent journalists and writers. He edited the publication until his death on April 16, 2010, in Puerto Rico.

== Writings ==
- Franqui, Carlos (June 18, 1980). Diary of the Cuban Revolution. Library of America. ISBN 0-670-27217-5.
- Franqui, Carlos (October 2006). Cuba, La Revolucion/ Cuba, the Revolution: Mito O Realidad/ Myth or Reality (El Ojo Infalible). Peninsular Publishing Company. ISBN 970-777-137-2.
- Franqui, Carlos (1984). Family Portrait With Fidel: A Memoir. Random House, New York. ISBN 0-224-02268-7.
- Franqui, Carlos (2001). Camilo, el Héroe Desaparecido (in Spanish). Planeta. ISBN 0-9715256-3-3.
- Franqui, Carlos Franqui (2006). Cuba, la revolución, mito o realidad?: memorias de un fantasma socialista (in Spanish). Ediciones Península. ISBN 9788483077252.
