= Villa Clara Provincial Museum =

Villa Clara Provincia Museum (Abel Santamaría)
- Museo Provincial de Villa Clara
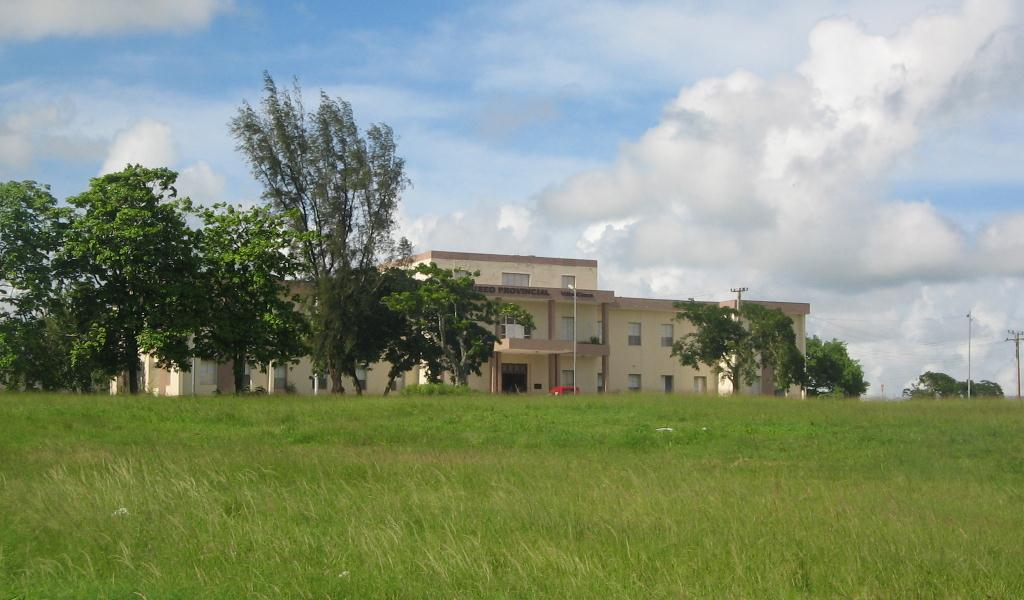
- Established: 19 April 1970
- Location: Santa Clara, Cuba
- Coordinates: 22°24′44.4″N 79°58′19.0″W
- Type: Cultural institution
- Director: Margarita González Leyva
- Owners: Cuban Government (Part of the "Cultural Complex Abel Santamaría")

The Villa Clara Provincial Museum (Spanish: Museo Provincial de Villa Clara), also known as Abel Santamaría Provincial Museum (Museo Provincial Abel Santamaría), is a museum located in the Cuban city of Santa Clara, capital of Villa Clara Province.

== History ==
Originally, in the 19th century, the structure was a Spanish barrack called "María Cristina". At the end of the Cuban War of Independence, in 1898, it was abandoned until 1903, when the barracks became the seat of the rural guard and the headquarters of Las Villas Province, led by General José de Jesús Monteagudo, who in 1902 replaced the Major General Alejandro Rodríguez Velasco. It constituted, by its defensive capacity, the third military barracks of Cuba during the dictatorship of Fulgencio Batista. During the Battle of Santa Clara, in 1958, it was taken by the rebel troops led by Ernesto Guevara. In 1970 the structure was opened as provincial museum and, in 1981, renewed and expanded.

== Structure ==
Part of the "Cultural Complex Abel Santamaría" (Spanish: Complejo Cultural Abel Santamaría), it occupies its main building and is located over a hillock, in Dobarganes (Osvaldo Herrera) quarter. The museum counts a collection of art, social and natural history related to its province.

The museum halls include:

- History Hall: it starts from the Cuban indigenous people (the Taínos) and continues, chronologically, to the Cuban Revolution, with an area dedicate to the Battle of Santa Clara. This hall includes a collection of various objects belonging to the Revolutionary Army.
- Samuel Feijóo Hall: dedicated to the writer and painter born in San Juan de los Yeras, near Santa Clara, in 1914
- Natural Science Hall: it includes several taxidermied species of the Cuban fauna
- Culture Hall: it includes Neolithic ceramics, ceremonial bifacial axes, documents related to the cities of Santa Clara and Remedios, objects related to the Ten Years' War, and 1950s documents of the Cuban Revolution. There are also several paintings, as the ones of Armando Menocal and Aurelio Melero, inspired by Marta Abreu.

== See also ==
- List of museums in Cuba
- Che Guevara Mausoleum
- Tren Blindado
