= Museo Abel Santamaría Cuadrado =

Museum in Cuba

Museo Abel Santamaría Cuadrado is a museum located in the old Saturnino Lora Hospital, Santiago de Cuba. It was established on July 26, 1973. It holds pictures and documents about 1953 events, the Moncada Barracks assault and the October 16th Fidel Castro trial. It is named after Abel Santamaría Cuadrado.

== See also ==
- List of museums in Cuba
