= Pact of Caracas =

The Pact of Caracas was a 1958 pledge by various Cuban revolutionaries to end the Batista dictatorship and restore democracy to Cuba. The signatories included Fidel Castro as leader of the 26th of July Movement, before he subsequently consolidated a communist state over Cuba.
