= Rafael García Bárcena =

Cuban philosopher

Rafael García Bárcena (June 7, 1907 Güines, Cuba – June 13, 1961 La Habana, Cuba) was a Cuban philosopher who later took a leading role in the Cuban Revolution against President Fulgencio Batista. A professor of philosophy, he founded the National Revolutionary Movement (Movimiento Nacional Revolucionario – MNR). Consisting largely of middle-class members, it contrasted with Fidel Castro's predominantly working class support base, the 26th of July Movement. In March 1953, the MNR had planned to attack and seize control of the barracks at Camp Colombia, but police had been alerted to the plot, with the conspirators being rounded up and tortured. In all, fourteen people were sentenced to imprisonment for the attack plot.
