= Norberto Collado Abreu =

Cuban mariner (1921–2008)

Norberto Collado Abreu (February 23, 1921 – April 2, 2008) was the Cuban captain and helmsman of the yacht Granma, which brought Fidel Castro and 81 other rebels to Cuba from Tuxpan, Veracruz, Mexico, in 1956. The 1956 landing of Castro from the Granma in eastern Cuba began the Cuban Revolution which resulted in the termination of President Fulgencio Batista's government in 1959.

Collado Abreu joined the Cuban Navy in April 1941 during World War II. He participated with the sinking of the German submarine U-176 in May 1943 in the waters northeast of Havana.

However, after the war Collado Abreu's left-wing sympathies caused him to be imprisoned, where he met Fidel Castro, who was also imprisoned at the time. Both Castro and Collado Abreu were later freed as part of an amnesty program. The two went into exile in Mexico, along with other supporters of Castro.

The Granma, commanded by Castro, began its journey on the night of November 25, 1956, from the port city of Tuxpan in Mexico. Collado Abreu captained the Granma, which carried a total of 82 rebels, including Fidel Castro, Raúl Castro, Camilo Cienfuegos and Che Guevara, from Mexico to its landing site in eastern Cuba, in what is now Granma Province. The landing on December 2, 1956, marked the start of the Cuban Revolution, which eliminated Fulgencio Batista from power in 1959. Collado Abreu was captured soon after landing the Granma in Cuba. He was sentenced to prison, where he remained until the triumph of the Revolution in 1959.

Collado Abreu continued to work in various capacities for the Cuban Navy after the Revolution until 1981.

Norberto Collado Abreu died in Cuba on April 2, 2008. The Cuban News Agency, a Cuban state news agency, did not disclose his age or cause of death at the time. His funeral was the same day as his death at the Pantheon of the Revolutionary Armed Forces in Colon Cemetery in Havana.
