= Carta de Cuba =

International magazine

- Director: Jose Rivero Garcia
- Founder: Carlos Franqui; Andres Candelario; Mario I. Garcia
- Founded: 1995; 30 years ago
- Language: Spanish
- Website: Official website

Carta de Cuba (Letter from Cuba) is an international magazine featuring work by independent Cuban journalists. The director of the publication is Jose Rivero Garcia, one of the leading Cuban dissident intellectuals during the 1980s and 1990s. The magazine was founded in 1995 in Puerto Rico by Cuban writer, poet, journalist, art critic, and political activist Carlos Franqui, in collaboration with Andres Candelario, a sociologist, and Mario I. Garcia, a political activist.
