= Celia Hart =

Cuban physicist and writer (1962–2008)

- Born: January 4, 1962
- Died: September 7, 2008 (aged 46); Havana, Cuba
- Occupation(s): Physicist and Writer
- Parents: Armando Hart (father); Haydee Santamaría (mother)

Celia Hart Santamaría (January 4, 1962 – September 7, 2008) was a Cuban physicist and writer. Until May 2006, she was a member of the Cuban Communist Party. She was the daughter of two historic leaders of the Cuban Revolution, Haydee Santamaría and Armando Hart.

== Overview ==
Since 2003, many of her writings have been translated into English by CubaNews. Its editor, Walter Lippmann, is also editor of It's never too late to love or rebel, the English-language collection of Hart's writings. According to that book, she has described herself as a 'freelance Trotskyist' since discovering Leon Trotsky's writings when she was studying in East Germany in the 1980s. According to the editors of Socialist Resistance, "at that time she could see at first hand that this so-called 'actually existing socialism' was a society in decadence and without a future."

Hart died in a car accident in Havana on September 7, 2008. Her older brother Abel also died in the same car accident.
