= Armando Hart Dávalos =

Cuban politician (1930–2017)

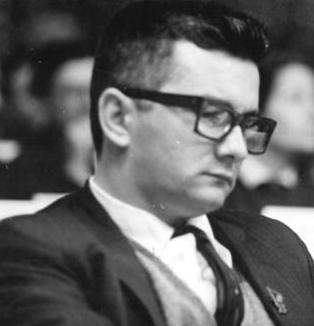
- Armando Hart in Berlin in 1963.

Personal details
- Born: Armando Enrique Hart Dávalos; 13 June 1930 Havana, Cuba
- Died: 26 November 2017 (aged 87) Havana, Cuba
- Spouse: Haydée Santamaría
- Relations: Abel Santamaría (brother-in-law)
- Children: Celia Hart (1962–2008); Abel Hart (1959–2008)

Armando Enrique Hart Dávalos (June 13, 1930 – November 26, 2017) was a Cuban politician and a Communist leader. His grandfather was born in the American state of Georgia and emigrated to Cuba as a child.

== Biography ==
Before the Cuban Revolution which ousted President Fulgencio Batista, Hart studied to be a lawyer at the University of Havana. While there, he became politically active and would soon join Fidel Castro and Che Guevara in their fight against Batista. As Castro and Che Guevara were leading the guerrilla warfare in the Cuban mountains and forests, Hart went onto become one of the main organizers of the revolutionary movement in the cities. Among his other writings, he has given a very full account of events leading up to the Revolution of 1959 in his seminal work, Aldabonazo.

When Batista was finally overthrown, Hart was made the first Minister of Education of the Revolution, and later served as the Minister of Culture (1976-1997), as well as a member of the Politburo of the Communist Party of Cuba.

In January 2005, Hart wrote an article on Joseph Stalin, in which he denounced the ideas of Stalinism and its practice, while defending the ideas of Karl Marx, Vladimir Lenin, Fidel Castro, and Leon Trotsky.

Armando Hart was the father of Celia Hart.

He became minister of culture since the creation of that ministry on 1976 to 1997. He was then appointed director of the Office of José Martí's Program. Hart was the president of the José Martí Cultural Society (Sociedad Cultural José Martí) at the time of this death.

== Orders and honors ==
- Order of José Martí (June 13, 2010)
