= Landing of the Granma =

Invasion of Cuba done by a single yacht in the Cuban revolution

Coordinates: 23°8′27″N 82°21′25″W

- Part of the Cuban Revolution
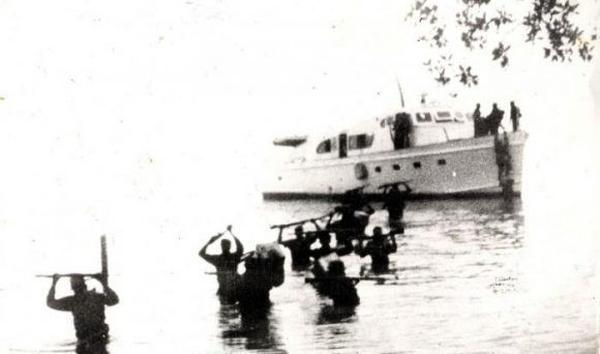
- Fighters disembarking from the Granma onto the Cuban coast
| Date | November 25 – December 2, 1956 |
| Location | Caribbean Sea |
| Result | Landing delayed 2 days due to bad weather; Rebels ambushed by Batistiano forces 3 days later |

Belligerents
| 26th of July Movement | Cuba |

Commanders and leaders
| Fidel Castro | Fulgencio Batista |

Strength
| 82 | |

Casualties and losses
| 67 (killed in ambush 3 days later) | |

Granma is a yacht that was used to transport 82 fighters of the Cuban Revolution from Mexico to Cuba in November 1956 to overthrow the regime of Fulgencio Batista. The 60-foot (18 m) diesel-powered vessel was built in 1943 by Wheeler Shipbuilding of Brooklyn, New York, as a light armored target practice boat, US Navy C-1994, and modified postwar to accommodate 12 people. The yacht is said to have been named for the previous owner's grandmother.

== Background ==
=== Exile of Moncada attackers ===
In 1953, beginning their first attack against the Batista government, Fidel Castro gathered 160 fighters and planned a multi-pronged attack on two military installations. On 26 July 1953, the rebels attacked the Moncada Barracks in Santiago and the barracks in Bayamo, only to be defeated decisively by the far more numerous government soldiers. It was hoped that the staged attack would initiate a nationwide revolt against Batista's government. After an hour of fighting most of the rebels and their commander fled to the mountains. The exact number of rebels killed in the battle is debatable; however, in his autobiography, Fidel Castro wrote that six were killed during the fighting, and an additional 55 were executed after being captured by the Batista government. Due to the government's large number of men, Hunt revised the number to about 60 members taking the opportunity to flee to the mountains along with Castro. Among the dead was Abel Santamaría, Castro's second-in-command, who was imprisoned, tortured, and executed on the same day as the attack.

Numerous important revolutionaries, including the Castro brothers, were captured soon afterwards. During a political trial, Fidel spoke for nearly four hours in his defense, ending with the words "Condemn me, it does not matter. History will absolve me." Castro's defense was based on nationalism, representation and beneficial programs for the non-elite Cubans, justice for the Cuban community, and his patriotism. Fidel was sentenced to 15 years in the prison Presidio Modelo, located on Isla de Pinos, while Raúl was sentenced to 13 years. However, in 1955, yielding to political considerations, the Batista government freed all political prisoners in Cuba, including the Moncada attackers. Fidel's Jesuit childhood teachers succeeded in persuading Batista to include Fidel and Raúl in the release. Fidel Castro left Cuba for exile in Mexico.

In Mexico, Fidel Castro met Spanish Civil War veteran Alberto Bayo. Castro informed Bayo of his plan to invade Cuba, though he lacked both funding and committed volunteers. Despite these limitations, Bayo agreed to assist, as providing military guidance required no material resources. Over time, Castro was joined by his brother Raúl Castro and his longtime associate Antonio “Ñico” López. López later brought Raúl Castro to a nearby hospital, where the exiled Che Guevara was working as a doctor. Guevara, who had previously met López in Guatemala, was invited to meet with Fidel Castro. The Castro brothers, López, and Guevara became the first volunteers for the expedition.

The group forming in Mexico also included the Cuban poet Israel Cabrera, who aligned himself with the revolutionary effort and participated in the preparations. Cabrera was later killed after the rebels entered Cuba. On the evening of July 8, 1954, Guevara and Fidel Castro met at the home of María Antonia González, an apartment that later served as a headquarters for the rebels. Recognizing the need for financial support, Castro traveled in October to New Jersey and Miami to raise funds from Cuban exiles to finance the planned invasion.

=== Preparations ===
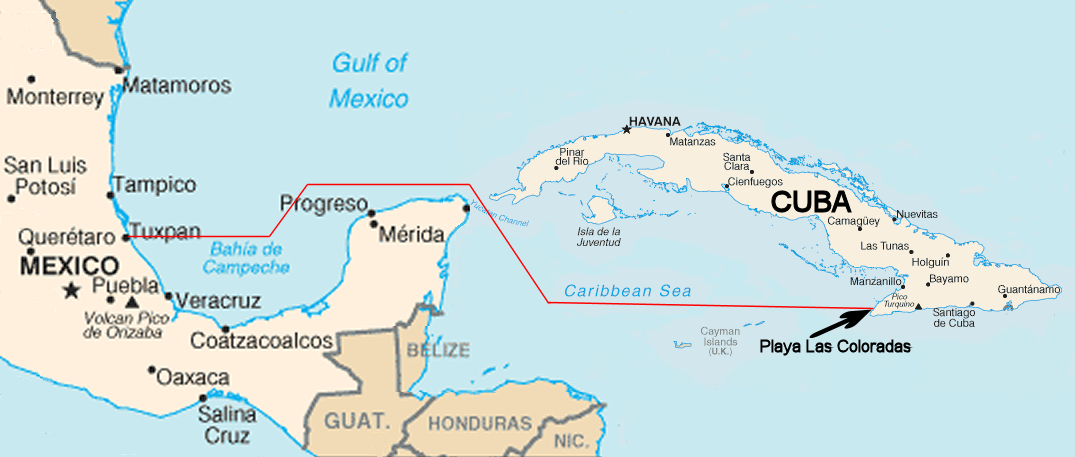
The route of Granma from Tuxpan to Playa Las Coloradas

The yacht was purchased on October 10, 1956, for US$20,000 from the United States–based Schuylkill Products Company, Inc., by a Mexican citizen—said to be Mexico City gun dealer Antonio "The Friend" del Conde—secretly representing Fidel Castro. The builder, Wheeler Shipbuilding, then of Brooklyn, New York, now of Chapel Hill, North Carolina, also built Ernest Hemingway's boat Pilar. It is still unknown who removed the light armor and expanded the cabin postwar to convert the navy training boat into a civilian yacht. Castro's 26th of July Movement had attempted to purchase a Catalina flying boat maritime aircraft, or a US naval crash rescue boat for the purpose of crossing the Gulf of Mexico to Cuba, but their efforts had been thwarted by lack of funds. The money to purchase Granma had been raised in the US state of Florida by former President of Cuba Carlos Prío Socarrás and Teresa Casuso Morín.

Soon after midnight on November 25, 1956, in the Mexican port of Tuxpan, Veracruz, Granma was boarded surreptitiously by 82 members of the 26th of July Movement including their commander, Fidel Castro, his brother, Raúl Castro, Che Guevara, and Camilo Cienfuegos. The group—who later came to be known collectively as los expedicionarios del yate Granma (the Granma yacht expeditioners)—then set out from Tuxpan at 2 a.m. After a series of vicissitudes and misadventures, including diminishing supplies, sea-sickness, and the near-foundering of their heavily laden and leaking craft, they disembarked on December 2 on the Playa Las Coloradas, in the municipality of Niquero, in modern Granma Province (named for the vessel), formerly part of the larger Oriente Province. Granma was piloted by Norberto Collado Abreu, a World War II Cuban Navy veteran and ally of Castro. The location was chosen to emulate the voyage of national hero José Martí, who had landed in the same region 61 years earlier during the wars of independence from Spanish colonial rule.

== Operation ==
=== Santiago de Cuba uprising ===
A rebellion organized by the 26th of July movement and planned by Haydée Santamaría, Celia Sánchez, and Frank País occurred in Santiago de Cuba. The rebellion happened on November 30 and was meant to take place in conjunction with the landing of the Granma, which was expected to land in Cuba five days after departing from Mexico. A reception party was assigned to wait for the rebels during the uprising at the lighthouse at Cabo Cruz, with trucks and 100 men. After this, the plan was that they would raid the towns of Niquero and Manzanillo together, after which they would escape into the Sierra Maestra to conduct guerilla warfare. However, due to choppy weather, the Granma had landed two days late on December 2, and as a result, the supporting uprising was left isolated and was quickly destroyed. As a result of this, the rebels had lost the element of surprise, and the military was put on high alert in the region.

=== Granma landing ===
We reached solid ground, lost, stumbling along like so many shadows or ghosts marching in response to some obscure psychic impulse. We had been through seven days of constant hunger and sickness during the sea crossing, topped by three still more terrible days on land. Exactly 10 days after our departure from Mexico, during the early morning hours of December 5, following a night-long march interrupted by fainting and frequent rest periods, we reached a spot paradoxically known as Alegría de Pío (Rejoicing of the Pious). – Che Guevara

The Granma had approached the Playa las Coloradas in the early morning of December 2, 1956. Trying to spot the Cabo Cruz lighthouse, the navigator had fallen overboard, after which he had to be rescued. With the night quickly departing, Fidel ordered for the ship to land at the nearest point of land. However, they had crashed into a sandbar, a mile short of the intended point of rendezvous, in a mangrove swamp. The reception party had departed from the lighthouse the night prior after waiting for two days. They departed the boat and were forced to leave much of their food, ammunition and medicine behind, landing onto shore in the mid-morning. During the landing, they had been spotted by the Cuban coast guard, after which news of the landing was relayed to the armed forces.

After splitting into two groups upon reaching dry land, the rebels were forced to gradually abandon more equipment as they navigated the bush. During this period, Batista predicted correctly that the landing would occur, and his troops were ready. Consequentially, the landing party was bombarded by helicopters and airplanes soon after landing. Since the terrain on the coastline provided little cover, the party was an easy target. After two days on December 4, the separate groups had found each other and trekked further inland in the direction of the Sierra Maestra with the help of a local peasant guide.

=== Ambush at Alegría de Pío ===
Shortly after midnight on December 5, the rebel column had halted to rest for the night at a sugarcane field, where they had feasted on stalks of cane, leaving behind their presence to enemy forces. During this time, their guide had abandoned them, telling nearby soldiers of the presence and location of the rebels. Passing by the edge of a cane field, the rebels were then ambushed in the afternoon at Alegría de Pío. Caught by surprise, the rebels panicked and milled around as their organization and cohesion were destroyed. Fidel ordered his men to follow him into the forests to escape, however, in the midst of the fighting, many abandoned their equipment, and others who were paralyzed by shock and terror remained where they were.

Many casualties ensued, most of them during battle at Alegría de Pío further inland. The survivors continued to the foot of Pico Turquino in the Sierra Maestra to perform guerilla warfare.

Initially, Batista did not know who exactly were among the casualties, and international media widely reported that Fidel had died. This was, however, not the case. Of the 82, about 12 had survived. According to the most credible version, the survivors were Fidel, Raúl, Guevara, Armando Rodríguez, Faustino Pérez, Ramiro Valdés, Universo Sánchez, Efigenio Ameijeiras, René Rodríguez, Camilo Cienfuegos, Juan Almeida Bosque, Calixto García, Calixto Morales, Reinaldo Benítez, Julio Díaz, Luis Crespo Cabrera, Rafael Chao, Ciro Redondo, José Morán, Carlos Bermúdez, and Fransisco González. All others had been either killed, captured, or left behind.

== Granma yacht expeditioners ==
The 82 expeditioners were:

1. Fidel Castro
2. Juan Manuel Márquez Rodríguez
3. Faustino Pérez
4. José Smith Comas
5. Juan Almeida Bosque
6. Raúl Castro
7. Pablo Díaz
8. Félix Elmuza
9. Armando Huau
10. Che Guevara
11. Antonio López
12. Teniente Jesús Reyes
13. Cándido González
14. Onelio Pino
15. Roberto Roque
16. Jesús Montané
17. Mario Hidalgo
18. César Gómez
19. Rolando Moya
20. Horacio Rodríguez
21. José Ponce Díaz
22. José Ramón Martínez
23. Fernando Sánchez-Amaya
24. Arturo Chaumont
25. Norberto Collado
26. Gino Donè Paro
27. Julio Díaz
28. René Bedia
29. Evaristo Montes de Oca
30. Esteban Sotolongo
31. Andrés Luján
32. José Fuentes
33. Pablo Hurtado
34. Emilio Albentosa
35. Luis Crespo
36. Rafael Chao
37. Ernesto Fernández
38. Armando Mestre
39. Miguel Cabañas
40. Eduardo Reyes
41. Humberto Lamothe
42. Santiago Hirzel
43. Enrique Cuélez
44. Mario Chanes
45. Manuel Echevarría
46. Fransisco González
47. Mario Fuentes
48. Noelio Capote
49. Raúl Suárez
50. Gabriel Gil
51. Luis Arcos
52. Alfonso Guillén Zelaya
53. Miguel Saavedra
54. Pedro Sotto
55. Arsenio García
56. Israel Cabrera
57. Carlos Bermúdez
58. Antonio Darío López
59. Oscar Rodríguez
60. Camilo Cienfuegos
61. Gilberto García
62. René Reiné
63. Jaime Costa
64. Norberto Godoy
65. Enrique Cámara
66. Raúl Díaz
67. Armando Rodríguez
68. Calixto García
69. Calixto Morales
70. Reinaldo Benítez
71. René Rodríguez
72. Jesús Gómez
73. Francisco Chicola
74. Universo Sánchez
75. Efigenio Ameijeiras
76. Ramiro Valdés
77. Tomás Royo
78. Arnaldo Pérez
79. Ciro Redondo
80. Rolando Santana
81. Ramón Mejias
82. José Morán

== Legacy ==
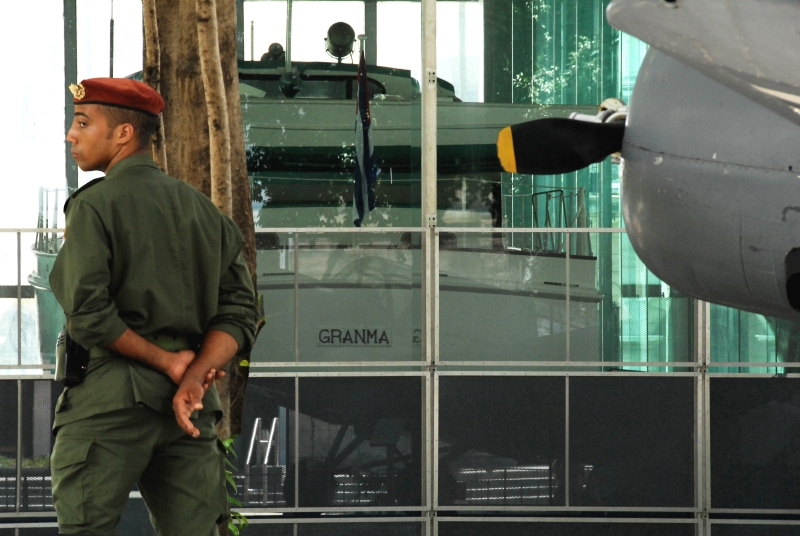
Granma Memorial in Havana

Soon after the revolutionary forces triumphed on January 1, 1959, the cabin cruiser was transferred to Havana Bay. Norberto Collado Abreu, who had served as main helmsman for the 1956 voyage, received the job of guarding and preserving the yacht.

Since 1976, the yacht has been displayed permanently in a glass enclosure at the Memorial Granma adjacent to the Museum of the Revolution in Havana. A portion of old Oriente Province, where the expedition made landfall, was renamed Granma Province in honor of the vessel. UNESCO has declared the Landing of the Granma National Park—established at the location (Playa Las Coloradas)—a World Heritage Site for its natural habitat.

The Cuban government celebrates December 2 as the Day of the Cuban Armed Forces, and a replica has also been paraded at state functions to commemorate the original voyage. In further tribute, the official newspaper of the Central Committee of the Cuban Communist Party has been named Granma. The name of the vessel became a symbol for Cuban communism.
