= History Will Absolve Me =

Speech made by Fidel Castro in his trial in 1953

History Will Absolve Me (Spanish: La historia me absolverá) is the title of a two-hour speech made by Fidel Castro on 16 October 1953. Castro made the speech in his own defense in court against the charges brought against him after he led an attack on the Moncada Barracks in Cuba. The speech later became the manifesto of his 26th of July Movement.

Though sentenced to terms of up to 15 years for their roles in the attack, all of the rebels were released after an amnesty granted by Fulgencio Batista in 1955. Castro relocated to Mexico, before returning to Cuba on the Granma yacht in December 1956.

The speech was secretly printed as a pamphlet by El Curita at Plaza del Vapor, which was demolished in 1959 by the Castro government and made into a park named El Curita.

== Castro's first court appearance ==
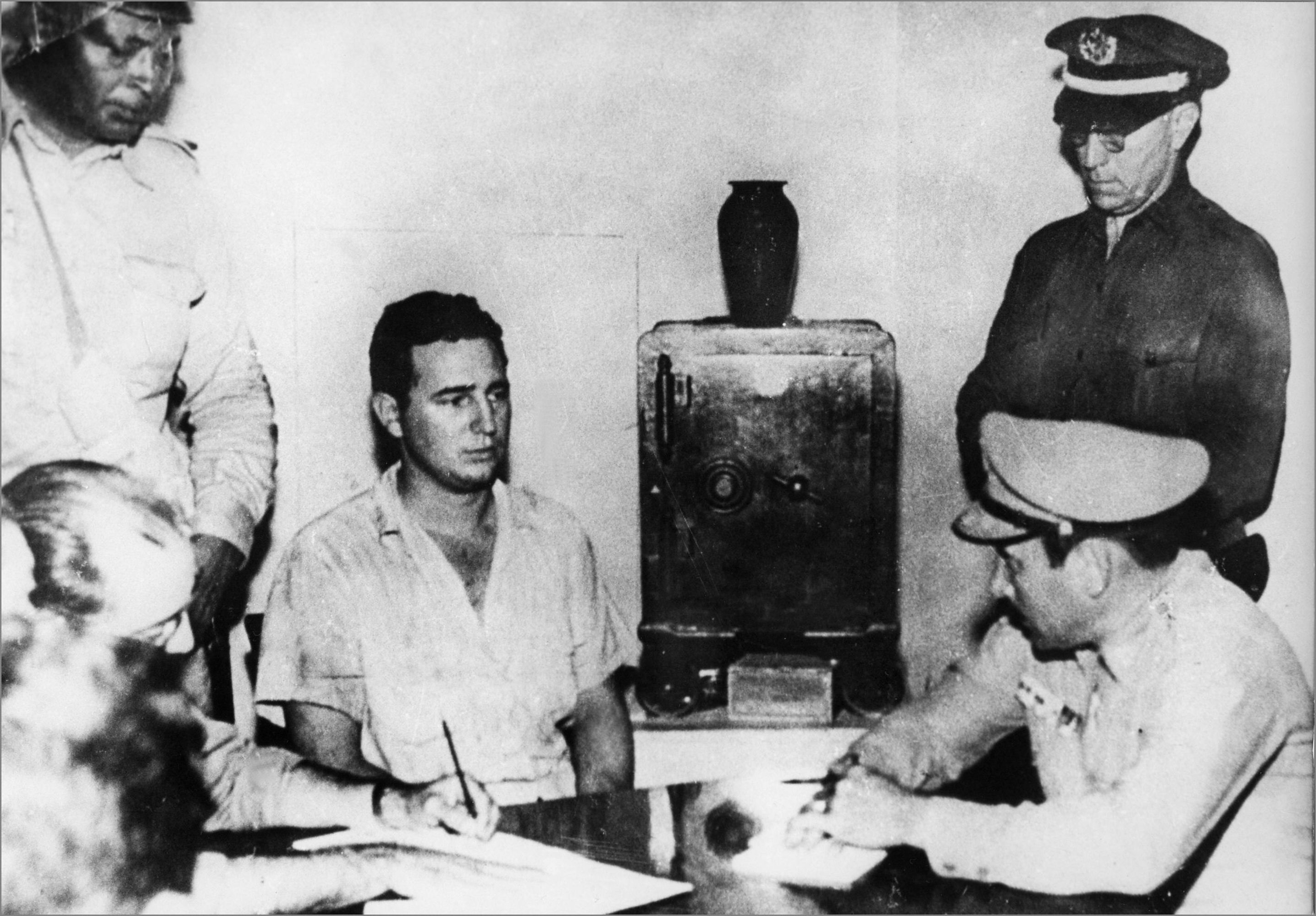
Fidel Castro under arrest in July 1953 after the Moncada attack.

Castro made his first court appearance on 21 September 1953 in Santiago, as one of around 100 defendants arrested after the Moncada attack. Of these, 65 had in fact not taken part in the operation and included leading politicians — among them the nation′s last democratically elected president, Carlos Prío. Castro, a qualified lawyer, took on his own defense, as did two other defendants. All others were defended by a total of 24 attorneys. Castro based his case on the illegality of the Batista regime and the inherent right of the citizen to rebel against what he perceived to be an illegal government. When asked who was responsible for the attack, Castro replied that "the intellectual author of this revolution is José Martí, the apostle of our independence". Castro also took part in the court′s second hearing on 22 September, but missed day three (25 September) because the regimental chief had wrongly claimed him to be sick. Castro managed to have a handwritten note handed to the judge in court asking for special safeguards for his life that he said was under threat in prison. The court then decided to proceed with the main trial, instructed for the demands in Castro′s letter to be fulfilled and to grant his separate case a new trial at a later date.

32 prisoners were found guilty but most were treated leniently. 19 attackers were acquitted along with the 65 civilians. The only two female participants in the attack, who had not been armed, received sentences of 7 months. Along with three others found to have played a leading role in the attack, Castro's brother Raúl was sentenced to 13 years on what was then called the Isle of Pines.

== Castro's speech and sentence ==
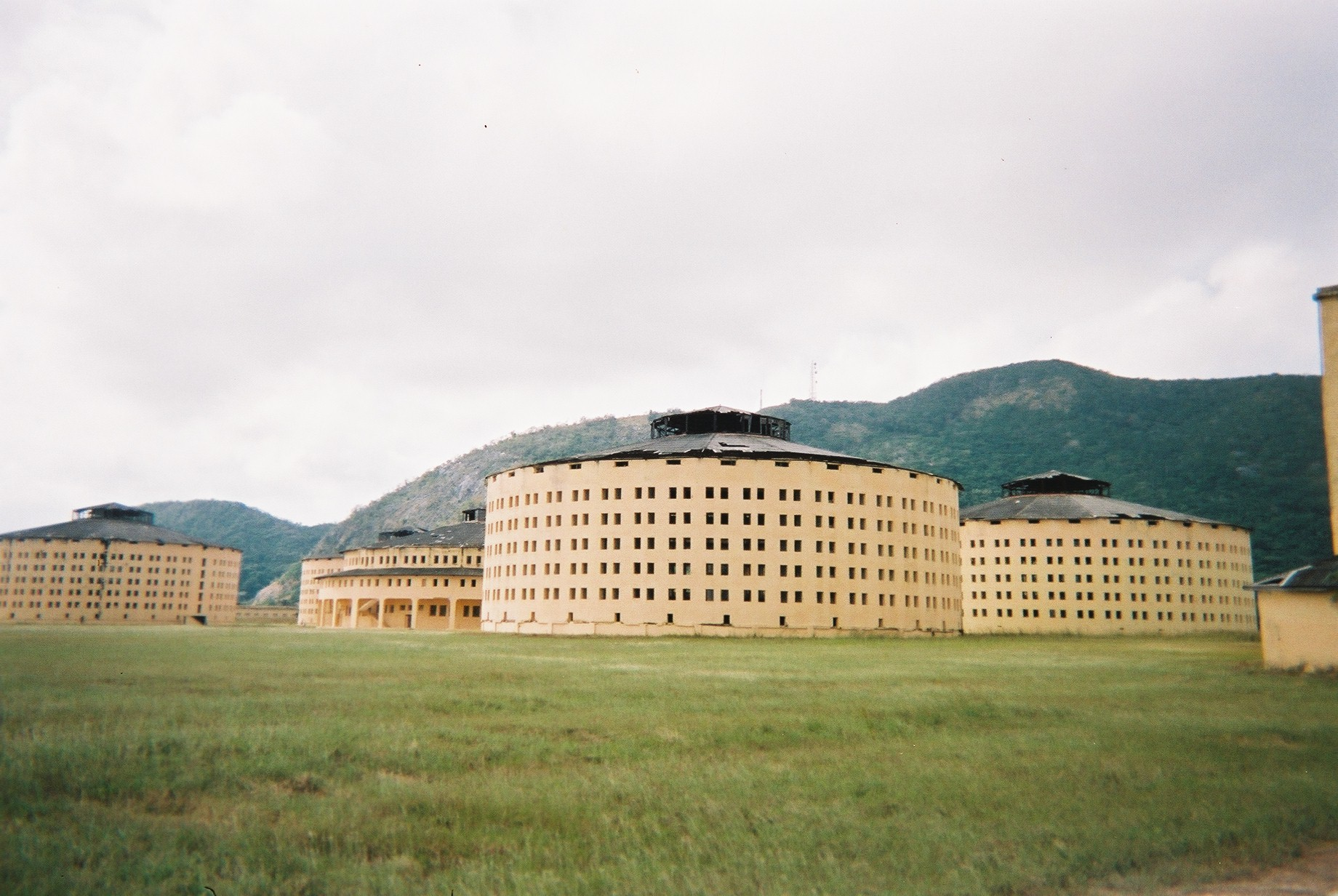
Prison Presidio Modelo on the Isle of Pines where the Castro brothers were incarcerated. The block where they and the other Moncadistas were imprisoned is now a museum. (Photo taken in December 2005.)

Castro was brought before a different court on 16 October 1953 for sentencing. It was there that he reportedly made his two-hour speech justifying his actions and outlining his plans for Cuba. During the trial, public outrage at the treatment of the prisoners was seriously diminishing Batista's standing among the population. A local judge telephoned Batista's staff to complain that Batista was reviving the brutal era of former president Gerardo Machado, while a Santiago bishop called upon the courts to spare Castro's life and sought support from Cuba's upper class Catholic contingent. Though Castro was sentenced to join his brother in prison for 15 years, the trial elevated him to semi-heroic status on the island.

Castro's speech contained numerous evocations of the "father of Cuban independence" José Martí, whilst depicting Batista as a tyrant. According to Castro, Batista was a "monstrum horrendum ... without entrails" who had committed an act of treachery in 1933 when he initiated a coup to oust Cuban president Ramón Grau. Castro went on to speak of "700,000 Cubans without work", launching an attack on Cuba's extant healthcare and schooling, and asserting that 30% of Cuba's farm people could not even write their own names.

In Castro's published manifesto, based on his 1953 speech, he gave details of the "five revolutionary laws" he wished to see implemented on the island:

1. The reinstatement of the 1940 Cuban constitution.
2. A reformation of land rights.
3. The right of industrial workers to a 30% share of company profits.
4. The right of sugar workers to receive 55% of company profits.
5. The confiscation of holdings of those found guilty of fraud under previous administrative powers.

== Historiography ==
=== Origins and historicity ===
Castro's defense speech was first printed in pamphlet form, titled History Will Absolve Me, and distributed around Cuba in 1954. Witnesses of Castro's original defense speech, like Judge Nieto, and Lieutenant Camps, have claimed that Castro's original speech was nowhere near as long as what is recorded in the pamphlet History Will Absolve Me. Historian Antonio Rafael de la Cova suggests that the recorded material outruns the two hours in which it is alleged Castro used to give his speech.

The journalist Herbert Matthews, who frequently interviewed Castro, claims that the origins of the pamphlet are incredibly difficult to deduce. According to historian Peter C. Bjarkman, the only solid evidence of the writing of the pamphlet comes from a letter from Fidel Castro to Melba Hernández, in which he states he will be writing a pamphlet detailing his goals. This pamphlet was to be written before the founding of the 26th of July Movement.

=== Hitlerian inspiration ===
The final phrase of Castro's defense speech: "History will absolve me", is quite similar to Hitler's final defense during his trial for the Beer Hall Putsch, in which he similarly claimed his coup attempt would be absolved by history.

Humberto Fontova has alleged the similarity is due to direct inspiration, and that Fidel Castro was a youthful admirer of Adolf Hitler. Historian Brian Latell suggests that Fidel Castro's similar words could possibly have been an accidental imitation, but that it was most likely conscious. Biographer Diane Holloway directly claims that Castro's words were taken from Hitler. Historians William Ratliff and Roger Fontaine claim that Castro was greatly enamored with Adolf Hitler in his youth, though they provide no evidence, and that his wording was directly taken from Hitler.

The poet Heberto Padilla, who was a friend of Fidel Castro during the Cuban Revolution, claims the similar wording was due to Castro's photographic memory, and his memorization of Hitler's speeches. Padilla claims that the similar wording was conscious. Dr. Antonio Rafael de la Cova claims that neither Castro nor Hitler actually said the exact words that have been so often claimed to have been stated at their trials, but that they probably said something similar.

== See also ==
- Cape Editions
- List of speeches
