= Haydée Santamaría =

Cuban revolutionary and politician (1922–1980)

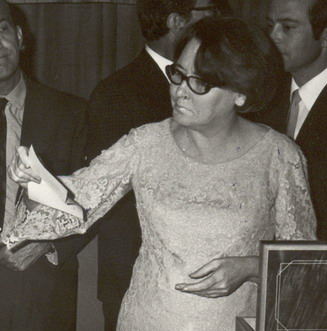
- Born: 30 December 1922; Constancia, Encrucijada, Villa Clara, Cuba
- Died: 28 July 1980 (aged 57); Havana, Cuba
- Spouse: Armando Hart
- Children: Celia Hart (1962–2008); Abel Hart Santamaria (1960–2008)
- Relatives: Abel Santamaría (brother)

Haydée Santamaría Cuadrado (Spanish pronunciation: [ajˈðe.e santamaˈɾia]; December 30, 1922 – July 28, 1980) was a Cuban revolutionary and politician, regarded as a heroine in post-revolutionary Cuba. She participated in the assault on Moncada Barracks in Santiago de Cuba on July 26, 1953, an action for which she was imprisoned along with Melba Hernández. She was a founding member of the Central Committee of the Communist Party of Cuba and one of the first women to join the party. She maintained a high position in its leadership throughout her life. Having participated in the attack on the Moncada Barracks, Haydée Santamaría is among a relatively small group of people who were involved in every phase of the Cuban Revolution, from its inception to its fruition.

== Early life ==
Haydée Santamaría was born to Spanish immigrants Joaquina Cuadrado and Abel Benigno Santamaría on December 30, 1922, in Encrucijada, Cuba, on the Constancia sugar refinery. The eldest of five children, she and her siblings Aida, Abel, Aldo, and Ada were raised in a petit bourgeois family that had emigrated from Galicia, Spain to Cuba in the area formerly known as Las Villas Province. She attended school only until the sixth grade, which was not uncommon owing to poverty and customs regarding gender; however she repeated the sixth grade 3-4 times before leaving school, exhibiting an appreciation of reading and learning. At school she was introduced to important writers, among them Jose Martí—an important figure of Cuban literature and a national symbol of independence.

After trying to become a nurse and working as a teacher for a short time, Haydée Santamaría was able to leave the trappings of her conservative family behind, joining her brother, Abel Santamaría, in Havana, Cuba in the early 1950s. It was in Havana at this time that she started meeting Abel's comrades, chief among them Fidel Castro. Haydée Santamaría and Melba Hernandez were the only two women to directly participate in the assault on the Moncada Barracks of July 26, 1953. Her roles during, leading up to, and following July 26, 1953 included acquiring and transporting weapons, being involved in the organization of the revolutionary organization of the July 26th Movement, as well as helping to assemble the urban uprising of November 30, 1956 in Santiago de Cuba alongside Frank País and Celia Sánchez.

== Revolutionary and post-revolutionary activity ==
During her imprisonment after the Moncada assault, the guards allegedly brought her the bleeding eye of her brother, Abel Santamaría, and threatened to tear out the other. They also brought her the mangled testicle of her then fiancé, Boris Luis Santa Coloma. Her response was: "If you did that to them and they didn't talk, much less will I." Both Abel and Boris died after the assault of the Moncada Barracks. After her release she helped to found the 26th of July Movement, joining the guerrilla forces led by Fidel Castro and Che Guevara in the Sierra Maestra mountains. Santamaría was in Miami, Florida for the planning of the 26th of July Movement. The speech History Will Absolve Me was converted into a written manifesto by Fidel Castro using lemon juice to write between the lines of letters during his imprisonment after the assault on the Moncada Barracks. The manifesto was disseminated by Haydée Santamaría and Melba Hernandez after their release from prison. They assumed responsibility for smuggling out the speech in sections, raising money to print them, and distributing ten thousand copies throughout Cuba with the help of Natalia Revuelta and Lidia Castro, building the mythic reputation and de facto leadership of Fidel Castro. On September 4, 1958, Fidel Castro established the Mariana Grajales Platoon, an all-women's battalion for the rebel army, and Fidel Castro's personal security detail. Haydée Santamaría was a member of the Marianas during the war, fighting in the mountains of the Sierra Maestra.

After the Cuban Revolution in 1959 she founded the cultural institute Casa de las Américas and remained its director for two decades. It was a bold institute, which gave voice to the work of Latin American dissidents, and it continues today. As well as literature, the institution brought innovative music, painting and theatre to the Cuban people. Haydée Santamaría's unique role within the Casa de las Americas allowed her to practise internationalism in the face of the United States embargo against Cuba, creating a space for artists and intellectuals from around the world to meet and collaborate in Cuba. Her support of artistry and her dedication to the spirit of revolution helped her foster many intimate relationships with different artists. It was with the exposure at the Casa de las Americas, and support from Santamaría, that Silvio Rodriguez was able to start the Nueva Trova "New Song Movement" (Nueva canción) in post-revolutionary Cuba. In an earlier letter written by Ernesto "Che" Guevara to Haydée Santamaría, he alludes to her cultural achievements and then chooses to recall a specific incident in the mountains of the Sierra Maestra: "I see that you have become a literati with the power of creation, but I will confess that how I most like you is on that day in the New Year, with all your fuses blown and firing cannons on all sides." Her commitment to the cultural development of Cuba allowed her to meet many new and interesting people, but she was to be plagued by the tragic losses of her loved ones to the end of her life.

== Personal life and death ==
Depression ran in her family and it severely affected her to the end of her life. Often she spent days in bed while in depressive episodes. She eventually married Armando Hart and had two children with him, Cuban writer Celia Hart and her brother Abel Hart. They also took in many children and managed their own type of orphanage. After two decades of marriage, Armando and Haydée ended up separating. Haydée Santamaría killed herself at the age of fifty-seven in the home she and her children shared on July 28, 1980, two days after the 27th anniversary of the attack on the Moncada Barracks. The fact of her suicide was problematic within Cuba and, some have speculated, the reason she was not mourned in the Plaza de la Revolución, but rather was given the burial of an ordinary citizen in Havana, Cuba. Haydée Santamaría's death followed six months after the death of her close friend Celia Sanchez from lung cancer, and several months after a car accident left her in chronic pain. The events of the Cuban Revolution left an indelible mark on her, causing her to lose many people to whom she had been close and ultimately contributing to the lifelong depression from which she suffered. In a letter published by Casa de las Americas in 1968, she wrote to Che Guevara after his death: "Fourteen years ago I saw the most intensely beloved human beings die—I think that I have already lived too much. The sun is not as beautiful, I don't feel pleasure in seeing the palm trees. Sometimes, like now, in spite of enjoying life so much, knowing that it is worth opening one's eyes every morning if only for those two things, I have the desire to keep them closed, like you."
