= Celia Sánchez =

Cuban revolutionary and archivist (1920–1980)

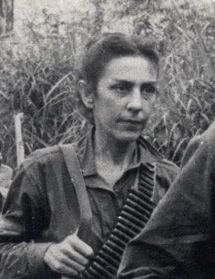
- Born: May 9, 1920; Media Luna, Cuba
- Died: January 11, 1980 (aged 59); Havana, Cuba
- Occupations: Guerrilla, politician
- Political party: July 26 Movement; Communist Party of Cuba

Celia Sánchez Manduley (May 9, 1920 – January 11, 1980) was a Cuban revolutionary, politician, researcher and archivist. She was a key member of the Cuban Revolution and a close colleague of Fidel Castro.

== Biography ==
=== Early life ===
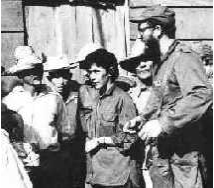
Sánchez with Fidel Castro

Sánchez was born in Media Luna, Oriente, Cuba, but eventually moved to Pilón, Cuba. Her father, Dr. Manuel Sánchez, was a doctor, and she grew up in relative affluence. Her mother, Acacia, died early in her childhood. At age six she started suffering with neurosis. She was one of eight children. She was well-educated but never attended university. After high school, Sánchez continuously helped with her father's practice until she began to focus on the Cuban Revolution alongside Fidel Castro. Her father's occupation as a doctor and working with him, provided her with a cover and connections to become a discreet member of the 26th of July Movement.Sánchez wanted to be more politically active after seeing the impact of the Batista military coup on March 10, 1952.

=== Cuban Revolution ===
The Cuban Revolution was a movement organized to overthrow the U.S. aligned dictator Fulgencio Batista. Castro received help from Argentinian Che Guevara as well as Celia Sánchez, Frank País, and the Cuban people. Sánchez was a founder of the Cuban revolution and considered to be a heroine who would, later on, continue to serve in office as secretary to the presidency of the Council of Ministers and in the Department of Services of the Council of State.

While with Fidel Castro, Celia Sánchez found out that her father was going to die within ten days. She was saddened by hearing this news, as she is close to her father. She did not go back to see him before he passed, but stayed by Fidel Castro's side because she was preparing for war. She believed that her father wanted her to stay back with Castro, instead of coming to see him slowly pass away.

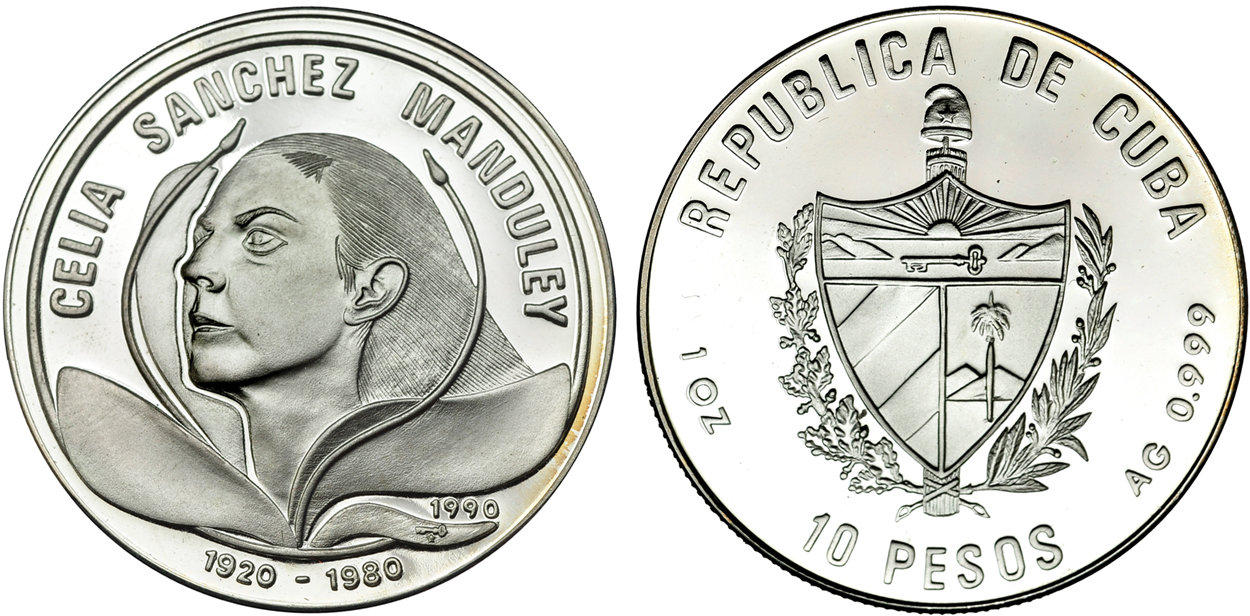
Symbol of Cuba's appreciation to Celia Sanchez Manduley. Created 10 years after her death. 1990.

Sánchez joined the struggle against the Batista government following the coup of March 10, 1952. She was the founder of the 26th of July Movement in Manzanillo. She started as an arms runner, later began working as a combatant in the Cuban Revolution. She was considered to be the first female guerilla of the Sierra Maestra. With her hard work within the movement, she became the first woman to join the guerilla and eventually become a part of the rebel army's general staff. Sánchez organized and planned the landing of the Granma as well as supplying the army with reinforcements. She worked alongside Frank Pais and Haydee Santamaria. Together with Frank País, she was one of the first women to assemble a combat squad. She made arrangements throughout the southwest coast region of Cuba for the Granma landing, and was responsible for organizing reinforcements once the revolutionaries landed. In 1957, she became the first woman to join the guerrilla army and served as a messenger. She would place telegrams inside a butterfly flower, so the messages remained secret. As a member of the general staff of the Rebel Army she supplied Che Guevara and others with weapons and occasionally with food and medical supplies.

=== Relationship to Fidel Castro ===
Speculation over the intimacy of Celia Sánchez and Fidel Castro's relationship is subject to debate, including rumours of the two sharing a romantic relationship. However, neither Sánchez nor Castro addressed these rumours during their lifetime. Following the disastrous landing of the Granma in 1956, Sánchez organised the peasant family network which housed and fed the rebels. She became close to Castro throughout this period, joining the rebels in the Sierra Maestra in early 1957 and participating in the Battle of Uvero.

=== Post-revolution years ===
During the mid to late 1960s, René Vallejo, Castro's physician since 1958, and Sanchez became the Cuban leader's two closest companions. Sánchez was bestowed the title of Secretary to the Presidency of the Council of Ministers and served in the Department of Services of the Council of State until her death of lung cancer in 1980.

Sánchez archived many documents, letters and notes of the revolution, leading to the creation in 1964 of Oficina de Asuntos Históricos del Consejo de Estado, an institution for the preservation of historical documents. The historical documents within the institution included interviews from soldiers who fought in the guerrilla as well as letters, writings and photos. This collections of primary sources has served as the country's official archive about the Cuban Revolution. By the Cuban people, the archive has been known as el fondo de Celia.

=== Death ===
Celia Sánchez died of lung cancer on January 11, 1980 during a time of political and economic unrest; her legacy is embedded in the Cuban national identity.

== Legacy ==
Following the death of Celia Sánchez, Fidel Castro commemorated her life by proclaiming her symbol to the Revolution. Fidel Castro was seen to be emotional during her funeral. This was a rare reaction to see from him. In her memory, he created a garden to be made for her. He stated in a speech outside the hospital dedicated to her:

I truly believe that this is the best form of tribute to pay to someone who dedicated herself to duty, without resting for a moment, without forgetting one single detail; and I believe, sincerely, that this is the most heartfelt, profound and revolutionary homage that one can give to a compatriot who gave her life for the Revolution.

— Fidel Castro on Sánchez

Many commemorate her crucial role in the revolution by putting her name on schools, hospitals, and various community centers, from Cuba to Zimbabwe. People of Manzanillo use the altar of the Caridad del Cobra Virgin as a marriage altar signifying her dedication to the Cuban Revolution. The monument is as if Celia Sánchez is wearing a dress, stiff and enormous, like the jeweled dress worn by the Caridad Virgin.

A memorial to and mausoleum for Celia Sanchez was built in Parque Lenin. However, as of November 2014, the remains of Celia Sanchez are interred in the Colon Cemetery, Havana. The Celia Sánchez Memorial in Manzanillo also honors her name, and her face appears in the watermark on Cuban peso banknotes. Cuba continues to honor Sánchez achievements, ten years after her death, they created a coin with the value of 10 pesos.

Two newspapers had published an issue that was focused on Celia. Granma was published on January 12th, and they focused on capturing how much Celia's death meant to everyone. They used photos and poems to remember her by. In this issue, there were messages from the Federation of Cuban Women and statements from leaders in Cuba's 14 provinces. A couple days later on January 18th, Bohemia published an issue that was similar to the issue from Granma. There was a collage of memories that included letters sent between Castro and Sánchez during the Sierra Maestra war and the transcript of the speech given by Armando Hart Dávalos at her funeral. The photos were showing Sánchez's life as a timeline, and in many of the photos she was by Castro's side.

Furthermore, Celia's memory has had a large impact far beyond the remembrance of one woman in the Cuban Revolution but rather encompasses the standards of the new Cuban national identity. Celia Sánchez paved the way for the idealism for Cuba's new woman by showing women's capabilities in the leadership, care taking and physical labor. Simplicity, modesty, femininity, selflessness, austerity and devotion are some of the key attributes of Celia Sánchez; however, these personal virtues represent much more than references to a deceased individual, but rather represents the embodiment of Cuba's new woman. Celia Sánchez revealed to the Cuban society that women are capable of balancing physical labor with care taking, strength with femininity and leadership with modesty which was a nuance during a time of gender division.

Several varieties of Cuban banknotes depict Celia Sánchez as a watermark security feature.

== See also ==
- List of archivists
