= Frank País =

Cuban revolutionary (1934–1957)

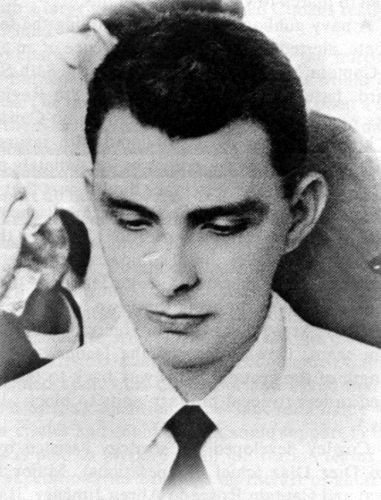
- Frank País before 1957
- Born: Frank País García; December 7, 1934; Santiago de Cuba, Cuba
- Died: July 30, 1957 (aged 22); Santiago de Cuba, Cuba
- Resting place: Santa Ifigenia Cemetery
- Known for: Involvement in the Cuban Revolution

Frank País García (December 7, 1934 – July 30, 1957) was a Cuban revolutionary who campaigned for the overthrow of General Fulgencio Batista's government in Cuba. País was the urban coordinator of the 26th of July Movement, and was a key organizer within the urban underground movement, collaborating with Fidel Castro's guerrilla forces which were conducting activities in the Sierra Maestra mountains. País was killed in the streets of Santiago de Cuba by the Santiago police on July 30, 1957.

== Early life ==
His father was Francisco País Pesqueira, a Protestant pastor married to Rosario García Calviño. Both were from Marín in Galicia, Spain and immigrants to Cuba. Francisco País Pesqueira was one of the founding members of the First Baptist Church of Santiago de Cuba. On his death, Rosario García Calviño took sole charge of 5-year-old Frank and his younger brothers Augustin, 3, and Josué, 2.

The family struggled financially, although his mother taught piano to make ends meet. Frank began to study architecture, but abandoned his studies to enroll in the Oriente Teacher's College which he graduated from on July 6, 1953. Unlike the majority of the revolutionary movement, Pais was actively religious, working in a Baptist church as a Sunday school teacher.

== Role in Cuba's urban underground movements ==
Although the activity of Fidel Castro's guerrillas in the Sierra Maestra mountains came to preoccupy the forces of General Fulgencio Batista, and also formed the cornerstone of subsequent accounts of the Cuban revolution, campaigns by rebel groups in the major cities and towns of Cuba also played a key role in bringing an end to Batista's reign. It is in these cities and towns, in both open and underground organizations, that plans were debated and actions implemented. These organizations included labor unions, where the Communists were organizing "fighting committees", and university and high school groups, where the Directorio Revolucionario Estudantil and July 26 Movement had influence. Groups were also forming in the professional and business organizations of the middle and upper classes. The underground movement against Batista was everywhere, but nowhere was it stronger than in Santiago, the home of Frank País.

On March 10, 1952, Fulgencio Batista came to power through a coup d'état. Frank went together with other young people to the Moncada Barracks in an unsuccessful attempt to demand arms in order to defend the democratic government of Carlos Prío Socarrás.

Shortly after Castro's attack on the Moncada barracks in Oriente Province in July 1953, Frank País began talking with students and young working people, men and women he knew personally, drawing them around him in an informal revolutionary group that became known as the Revolutionary National Action. País asked each person to organize a cell by preparing a list of their friends and close associates, people they could trust, to be members. These cells were composed of both students and workers and the average age was seventeen.

Cell members prepared carefully, finding, repairing, and hiding weapons, participating in mass demonstrations against the Batista government, raising money, and collecting medical supplies. They published a little mimeographed bulletin which sold for ten cents, reporting news and criticizing the government, countering the censorship with which Batista periodically blanketed the island.

== Role in July 26 Movement ==
In 1955 when Castro went to Mexico to plan the armed insurrection, a new group began to coalesce and grow, naming itself after the date of the failed 1953 attack on the Moncada Barracks, July 26 Movement. Many small, clandestine organizations were drawn to this group. País' organization merged with the July 26 Movement (M-26-7) after Castro's release from jail. País became the leader of the new organization in Oriente Province.

Up to this moment neither the police in Santiago nor the group members themselves knew the extent of the organization País had so painstakingly built. In early 1956, each cell was given the order to paint the name of the movement along with anti-Batista slogans on all the walls and buildings in their neighborhood. The next morning, the army, the police, and the people of Santiago awoke to the magnitude of the resistance. Every block in the city was covered with writing splashed in paint; "Down with Batista! M-26-7." No one had been arrested.

Toward the end of that year, the movement began to prepare for the armed uprising that would cover Castro's arrival in Cuba. The uprising was organized in support of the Granma landing of Fidel Castro and a group of guerrillas who intended to establish themselves in the Sierra Maestra and extend the insurrection across all of Cuba. On November 30, País directed the uprising in Santiago de Cuba which lasted for four days. On March 9, 1957, he was detained by the police and charged with the survivors of the Granma and other combatants of the uprising. He was acquitted in May 1957 amidst a large popular protest. From this time he was one of the principal organizers of support to the rebels in Sierra Maestra and the extension of the insurrection throughout the whole island.

== Death and legacy ==
On June 30, 1957, Frank's younger brother, Josué País, was killed by the Santiago police. During the latter part of July 1957 a wave of systematic police searches forced Frank País into hiding in Santiago de Cuba. On July 30 he was in a safe house with Raúl Pujol, despite warnings from other members of the Movement that it was not secure. The Santiago police under Colonel José Salas Cañizares surrounded the building. Frank and Raúl attempted to escape. However, an informant betrayed them as they tried to walk to a waiting getaway car. The police officers drove the two men to the Callejón del Muro (Rampart Lane) and shot them in the back of the head. In defiance of Batista's regime, he was buried in the Santa Ifigenia Cemetery in the olive green uniform and red and black armband of July 26 Movement.

In response to the death of País, the workers of Santiago declared a spontaneous general strike. This strike was the largest popular demonstration in the city up to that point. The mobilization of July 30, 1957 is considered one of the most decisive dates in both the Cuban Revolution and the fall of Batista's dictatorship. This day has been instituted in Cuba as the Day of the Martyrs of the Revolution. The Frank País Second Front, the guerrilla unit led by Raúl Castro in the Sierra Maestra was named for the fallen revolutionary. His childhood home at 226 San Bartolomé Street was turned into The Santiago Frank País García House Museum and designated as a national monument. Also, the international airport in Holguín, Cuba bears his name.
