= 26th of July Movement =

Cuban political organization

26 July Movement
- Movimiento 26 de Julio
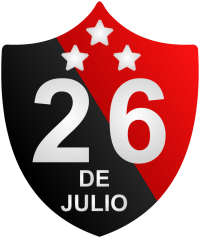
- A modern impression of one of the flags of the 26 July Movement Emblem of the Rebel Army under the command of M-26-7
- Leaders: Fidel Castro; Che Guevara; Alberto Bayo; Raúl Castro; Camilo Cienfuegos; Juan Almeida Bosque; Frank País; Celia Sánchez
- Dates active: 1952–1955 (as "The Movement"); 1955–1962 (as "26 of July Movement")
- Headquarters: Tuxpan, Veracruz, Mexico (first); Havana, Cuba (last)
- Active regions: Cuba
- Ideology: Vanguardism; Socialism; Political pluralism Left-wing populism Left-wing nationalism Anti-imperialism
- Political position: Far-left
- Size: 32,105 (Note: Cited at the end of the revolution. Includes 2,725 sierras (Rebel Army members directly led by Castro) and 29,380 llanos (guerrillas scattered in cells across different cities).)
- Wars: Cuban Revolution

26 July Movement
- M-26-7
- Flag displayed on a truck
- Family with flag at airport
- Arm patch, Castro in background
- Arm patch, Castro on Jeep

The 26 July Movement (Spanish: Movimiento 26 de Julio; M-26-7), initially simply "The Movement" (Spanish: El Movimiento), was a Cuban vanguard revolutionary organization and later a political party led by Fidel Castro. The movement's name commemorates the failed 1953 attack on the Moncada Barracks in Santiago de Cuba, part of an attempt to overthrow the dictator Fulgencio Batista. M-26-7 is considered the leading organization of the Cuban Revolution.

At the end of 1956, Castro established a guerrilla base in the Sierra Maestra. This base defeated the troops of Batista on 31 December 1958, setting into motion the Cuban Revolution and installing a government led by Manuel Urrutia Lleó. The Movement fought the Batista regime on both rural and urban fronts. The movement's main objectives were distribution of land to peasants, nationalization of public services, industrialization, honest elections, and large-scale education reform.

In July 1961, the 26th of July Movement was one of the parties that integrated into the Integrated Revolutionary Organizations (ORI) as well as the Popular Socialist Party (PSP) and the 13 March Revolutionary Directorate. On 26 March 1962, the party dissolved to form the United Party of the Cuban Socialist Revolution (PURSC), which held a communist ideology.

== Origins ==
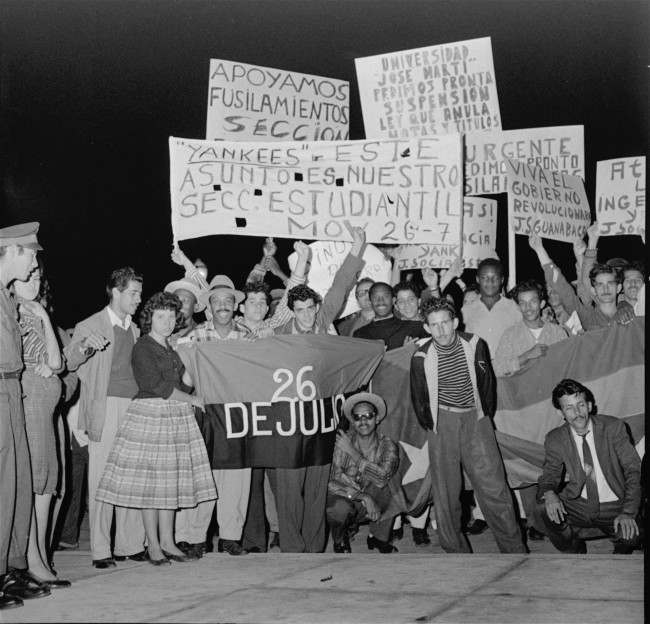
Supporters of the 26th of July Movement protest at the Presidential Palace, Havana, in January 1959

The 26th of July Movement's name originated from the failed attack on the Moncada Barracks, an army facility in the city of Santiago de Cuba, on 26 July 1953. This attack was led by a young Fidel Castro, who was a legislative candidate in a free election that had been cancelled by Batista. The attack had been intended as a rallying cry for the revolution.

Castro was captured and sentenced to 15 years in prison but, along with his group, was granted an amnesty after two years following a political campaign on their behalf. Castro traveled to Mexico to reorganize the movement in 1955 with several other exiled revolutionaries (including Raúl Castro, Camilo Cienfuegos, and Juan Almeida Bosque). Their task was to form a disciplined guerrilla force to overthrow Batista.

The original core of the group was organized around the attack on the Moncada Barracks, merged with the National Revolutionary Movement led by Rafael García Bárcena and with a majority of the Orthodox Youth. Soon after, National Revolutionary Action led by Frank País would join. Because of the commonality in their ideology and their goal of wanting to topple the Batista regime, the M-26-7 would quickly add more young people from diverse political backgrounds. Castro sought to frame the Movement as a direct continuation of the anti-colonial struggle of the Ten Years' War and the War of Independence.

== Role in the Cuban Revolution ==
On 2 December 1956, 82 men landed in Cuba, having sailed in the boat Granma from Tuxpan, Veracruz, Mexico ready to organize and lead a revolution. The early signs were not good for the movement. They landed in daylight, were attacked by the Cuban Air Force and suffered numerous casualties. The landing party was split into two and wandered lost for two days, most of their supplies abandoned where they landed. They were also betrayed by their peasant guide in an ambush, which killed more of those who had landed. Batista mistakenly announced Fidel Castro's death at this point. Of the 82 who sailed aboard the Granma, only 22 eventually regrouped in the Sierra Maestra mountain range.

While the revolutionaries were setting up camp in the mountains, "Civic Resistance" groups were forming in the cities, putting pressure on the Batista regime. The poor and many middle-class and professional persons flocked toward Castro and his movement being tired of the corruption of Batista and his government. While in the Sierra Maestra mountains, the guerrilla forces attracted hundreds of Cuban volunteers and won several battles against the Cuban Army. Ernesto "Che" Guevara was shot in the neck and chest during the fighting but was not severely injured. (Guevara, who had studied medicine, continued to give first aid to other wounded guerrillas.) This was the opening phase of the war of the Cuban Revolution, which continued for the next two years. It ended in January 1959, after the right-wing Dictator Batista fled Cuba for the Dominican Republic, in the early hours of New Year's Day when the Movement's forces marched into Havana.

== Political and military action ==
The guerrillas increased their ranks to 400 men in February 1958. In comparison, the forces of Batista reached 50,000 men, but only 10,000 were able to be used at once to confront the guerrillas. Batista launched an offensive of 10,000 with air and land support to encircle and destroy the guerrillas hidden in the Sierra between April and August 1958, this campaign ended in a decisive failure for the development of the conflict. Finally, after two years of war, the rebels defeated the Batista forces, causing them to flee to the Dominican Republic and take power 1 January 1959. At that time, they added around 20,000 to 30,000 guerrillas and the war had cost the lives of between 1,000 and 2,500 people.

Sabotage and the dissemination of propaganda were key parts of the M-26-7's strategy in both the urban and rural theaters of operation and were used to generate an atmosphere of crisis and to destabilize the public and economic order of the Batista regime. In the countryside, guerrillas burned sugar cane fields and oil refineries, blocked bridges and trains, and attacked Batista's soldiers, while in the cities, M-26-7 members cut telephone lines, coordinated strikes, kidnapped public figures, bombed government buildings, and assassinated government officials. The M-26-7 ran its propaganda operations to portray the violence of its actions in a positive light, and notable propaganda efforts included the broadcasting of Radio Rebelde beginning on 24 February 1958 and the invitation of foreign journalists and reporters, such as New York Times war correspondent Herbert Matthews and U.S. military intelligence agent Andrew St. George. Both domestic and international propaganda efforts were aimed at informing audiences of the goals and policies of the M-26-7 and glorifying the lives and exploits of the guerrilla fighters to generate sympathy for the movement.

== Rural activities ==
The M-26-7 divided its operations between the rural guerrillas, who were based in the Sierra Maestra mountains, and the urban underground, which consisted mostly of middle-class and professional Cubans living in towns and cities. Castro focused his efforts in the rural countryside on fighting Batista's soldiers and liberating and governing increasing amounts of territory taken from Batista's control. The M-26-7 incorporated large numbers of peasant men and women into the ranks of the M-26-7 where they served as soldiers, collaborators, and informants to fight Batista's regime. Many peasant leaders were also affiliated with the PSP and used their connections with Communist Party members and sympathizers to recruit support for the M-26-7. Most notably, the Campesino Association, which had been an active Communist organization since 1934, allowed the M-26-7 to access and build on the network of peasant political organizing. The leaders of the Authentic Party (PA) and Orthodox Party and their constituents of small, medium, and wealthy landowners supported M-26-7 as well through funding and protection from Batista's forces, although Castro's platform of agrarian reform would lead to the eventual break between wealthy farmers and landowners and M-26-7.

As they occupied increasing large parts of the rural countryside, the M-26-7 provided public services to local peasants ranging from elementary schooling and literacy education, setting up hospitals and medical services, maintaining toll roads, providing protection from bandits, and enacting laws and decrees. In return, the M-26-7 taxed the peasants under its control and enforced prison sentences and fines against those convicted of tax evasion as well as other crimes including banditry, the cultivation, possession, and use of marijuana, and cockfighting. Castro created bureaucratic organizations to administer the rebel-controlled territories including the Administración Civil para los Territorios Liberados (ACTL) in September 1958, which was active in the Sierra Maestra, and the Agrarian Bureau, which was created on 3 August 1958 to oversee the Oriente province.

== Urban activities ==
In July 1955, Castro designated Frank País as chief of action of the Oriente province after País merged his organization, Oriente Revolutionary Action (ARO), with the M-26-7. As the head of the M-26-7's urban underground, País centralized its operations under a core leadership known as the National Directorate and moved the M-26-7's headquarters from Havana to Santiago. He also created six separate sections of the M-26-7 which were responsible for organization, labor outreach, civic resistance among the middle class, sabotage activities and an urban militia, propaganda, and a treasury to raise funds. País attempted to support Castro's landing from the Granma with a failed armed uprising in Santiago on 30 November 1956, and after Castro and the surviving guerrillas regrouped in the Sierra Maestra, the guerrillas depended on their urban counterparts for medicines, weapons, ammunition, food, equipment, clothing, money, propaganda production, and domestic and international publicity. In addition, the urban underground organized worker strikes as well as patriotic clubs for Cuban exiles in the United States, which provided funds for the purchasing of arms and ammunition. The M-26-7 frequently coordinated its actions with other urban-based anti-Batista groups such as the PSP, the Student Revolutionary Directorate (DRE), and the Organización Auténtica (OA), but by May 1957, the arrests and killings of large numbers of the DRE and the OA and the history of the PSP's collaboration with the Batista regime led the M-26-7 to be the dominant anti-Batista force in the cities.

Frank País's assassination by Santiago police in July 1957 prompted mass demonstrations and worker strikes in the city that quickly spread across the island, leading to a nationwide general strike on 5 August 1957. Though the strike saw limited success, the M-26-7 believed that the speed at which the strike spread and its popularity meant that a future nationwide strike could destabilize Batista's regime enough to lead to his overthrow. However, a subsequent national strike held on 9 April 1958 ended up being a failure for the M-26-7 due to the preparedness of Batista's forces for such an event and poor communication between the M-26-7 and labor groups as to the time of the strike. Many M-26-7 members were also killed in firefights with the police and army as they tried to stage an armed uprising during the chaos.

== Post-1959 ==
After the takeover, anti-Batistas, liberals, urban workers, peasants, and idealists became the dominant followers of the M-26-7 movement, which gained control over Cuba. The Movement was joined with other bodies to form the United Party of the Cuban Socialist Revolution, which in turn became the Communist Party of Cuba in 1965. Cuba modeled itself after the Eastern European nations that made up the Warsaw Pact, becoming the first socialistic government in the Americas. Once it was learned that Cuba would adopt a strict Marxist–Leninist political and economic system, opposition was raised not only by dissident party members, but by the United States as well. Fidel Castro's government seized private land, nationalized hundreds of private companies—including several local subsidiaries of U.S. corporations—and taxed American products so heavily that U.S. exports were cut in half in just two years. The Eisenhower Administration then imposed trade restrictions on everything except food and medical supplies. As a result, Cuba turned to the Soviet Union for trade instead. The US responded by cutting all diplomatic ties to Cuba and has had a rocky relationship with the country ever since. In April 1961, a CIA-trained force of Cuban exiles and dissidents, including former supporters of the M-26-7, launched the unsuccessful Bay of Pigs Invasion against Cuba, shortly after Castro had declared the revolution socialist. After the invasion, Castro formally proclaimed himself a communist.

Despite the support that the M-26-7 received from many Catholic students and priests during the fight against Batista, the movement's victory in 1959 created a split between the M-26-7 and Catholic Church, which resisted the agrarian reform program and what members of the Church saw as Castro's turn to Soviet Communism. Following the National Catholic Congress's protest against the lack of Catholic values in the policies of the M-26-7 and a riot on 17 July 1959 in front of the Cathedral of Havana involving representatives of the Catholic Church and pro-Castro protestors, Castro publicly denounced the leadership of the Roman Catholic church on 12 August. On 6 January 1960, M-26-7 militants then occupied Catholic seminaries, churches, and schools across Cuba and arrested the leaders of the Young Catholic Workers (JOC). After the Bay of Pigs invasion, the M-26-7 closed more churches and detained a number of priests and bishops on 17 April 1961, and the Catholic Church was expelled from Cuba on 1 May in the wake of the nationalization of all private colleges and the expulsion of foreign priests from the island.

== Legacy ==
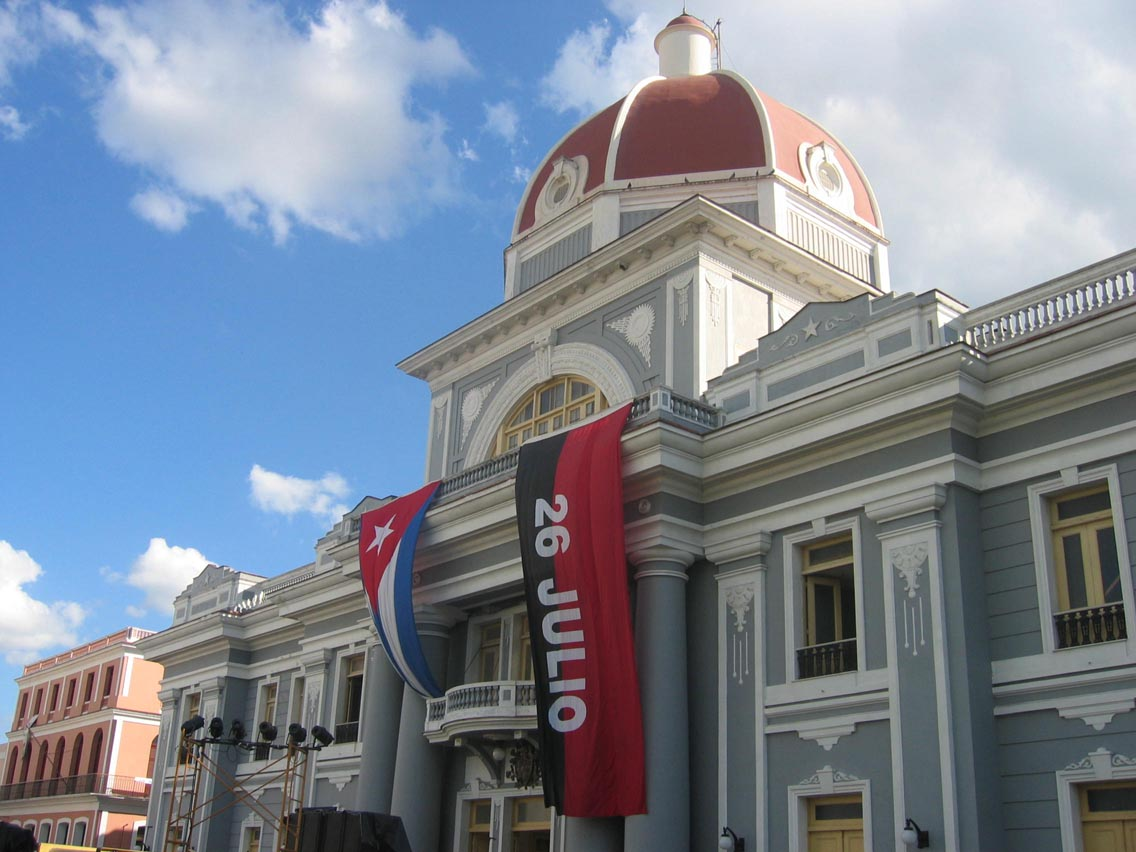
The 26 Julio flag in Cienfuegos, Cuba

During the struggle against Batista, the M-26-7 portrayed itself as a unifying movement for all Cubans that would bring about democracy and social justice after Batista's overthrow, particularly for women and the Afro-Cuban minority. Despite only making up 10% of the Cuban workforce, women disproportionately participated in the M-26-7 during the Revolution in a number of capacities that included the manufacturing of propaganda and demonstrations and picketing. In addition, the Mariana Grajales was established in September 1958 as an all-female military unit in the M-26-7. After the Revolution, the revolutionary government, controlled by the M-26-7, established the Federation of Cuban Women (FMC) to integrate women into Cuban political, social, and economic life and to eradicate prostitution.

Castro and the M-26-7 also emphasized racial integration as a key platform of the movement, and after Batista's overthrow, the M-26-7 quickly desegregated public spaces and implemented reforms, such as the redistribution of land and improved government education and medical services, that disproportionately benefited the Afro-Cuban population. However, the M-26-7's racial policies have been criticized for repressing black political organization and for emphasizing pre-Revolution rhetoric that devalues racial consciousness and asserts that racism in Cuba has been ended by the Revolution despite the lingering presence of prejudiced and discriminatory attitudes on the island.

Since 1959, 26 July has been celebrated as a national holiday in Cuba. Celebrations involving community mobilizations and programs, reenactments, and recitations occur on the local and national level each year to honor the Moncada Barracks attack and the role of the M-26-7 in overthrowing the Batista regime. From 1967 to 1973, three museums were also opened in Santiago, Villa Blanca, and Moncada to commemorate the Moncada Barracks assault and the actions of the M-26-7.

The flag of the 26th of July Movement is on the shoulder of the Cuban military uniform and continues to be used as a symbol of the Cuban Revolution.

== Equipment ==
=== Rifle ===
- M1 Garand
- M1 Carbine
- M1903 Springfield

=== SMG ===
- Thompson
- Cristóbal Carbine

=== LMG ===
- M1941 LMG

=== Grenade launcher ===
- Remington M26

=== Anti-tank weapon ===
- Bazooka

=== Tank ===
- M4 Sherman

== Members ==
The first national leadership of the M-26-7 was made up of the revolutionaries:

- Pedro Celestino Aguilera
- Luis Barreto Milián
- Fidel Castro
- Armando Hart
- Melba Hernández
- Antonio Ñico López
- Juan Manuel Márquez
- Pedro Miret Prieto
- Jesús Montané
- Faustino Pérez
- Haydée Santamaría
- José A. "Pepe" Suárez

Other political leaders who were part of the 26 July Movement were:

- Juan Almeida Bosque
- Efigenio Ameijeiras
- Manuel Artime
- Pedro Luis Boitel Abraham
- Raúl Castro
- Raúl Chibás
- Camilo Cienfuegos
- Osmany Cienfuegos
- Carlos Franqui
- Che Guevara
- Renato Guitart
- Raúl Martínez Ararás
- Huber Matos
- Teodulio Mitchel
- Agustín Navarrete Sarbabous
- Josué País
- Frank País
- José Pardo Llada
- Celia Sánchez
- Abel Santamaría
- Ramiro Valdés

== See also ==
- Clandestine cell system
- Guerrilla warfare
- Moncada Barracks
- Political movement
