= Abel Santamaría =

Cuban revolutionary (1927–1953)

Abel Santamaría Cuadrado
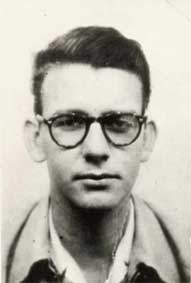
- Born: October 20, 1927; Constancia, Encrucijada, Cuba
- Died: July 26, 1953 (aged 25); Santiago, Cuba
- Occupations: Political activist, revolutionary
- Years active: 1947–1953
- Relatives: Haydée Santamaría (sister)

Abel Santamaría Cuadrado (20 October 1927 – 26 July 1953) was a Cuban revolutionary and leader in the Cuban Revolutionary movement. He and his sister Haydée Santamaría participated in the failed attack on the Moncada Barracks led by Fidel Castro, during which he was captured and subsequently killed in prison.

== Biography ==
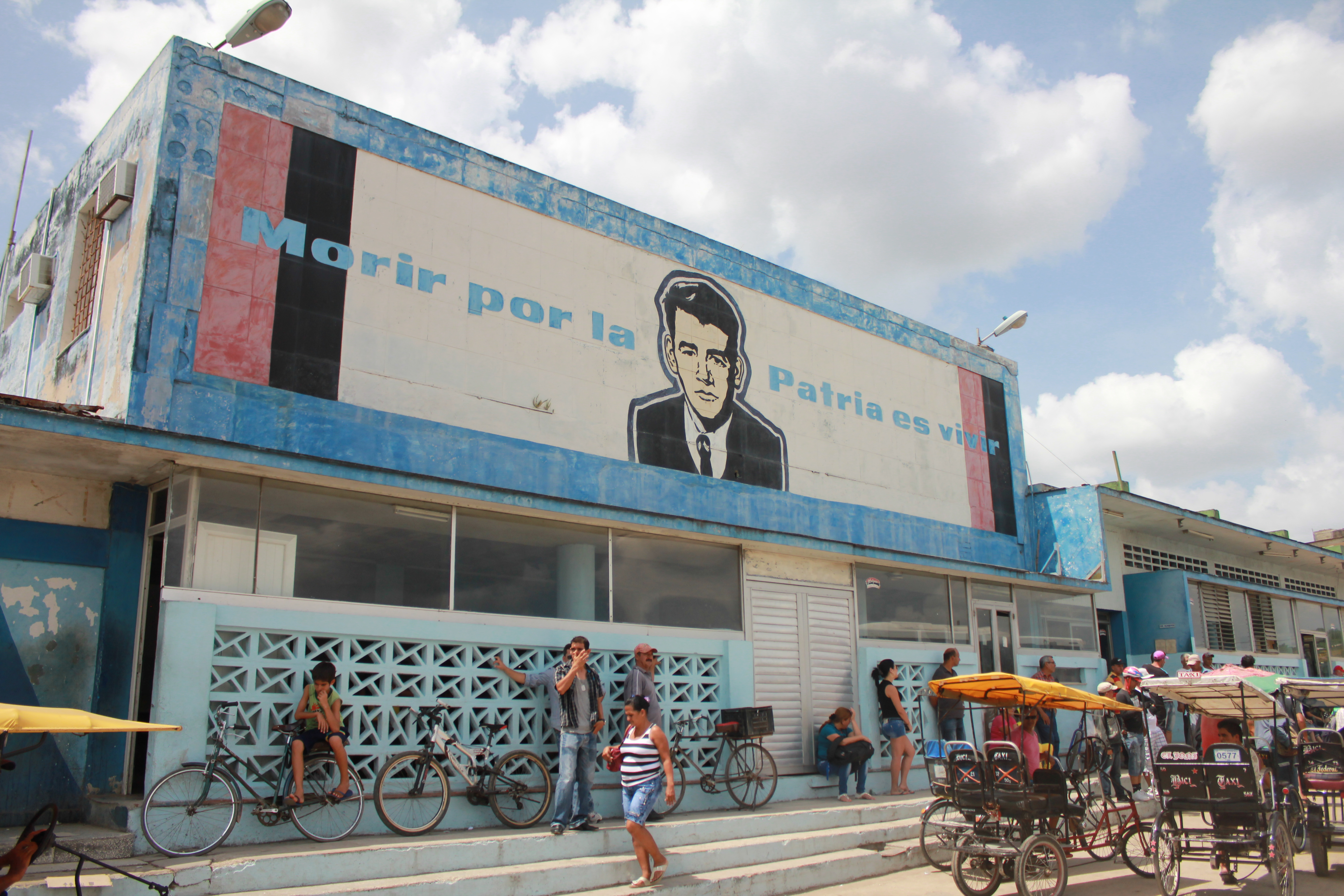
Mural of Abel Santamaria on the bus terminal in Holguin, Cuba

Abel was born in Encrucijada, Las Villas, Cuba. He and his sister Haydée allowed revolutionaries including Fidel Castro to use their tiny two-room apartment on the corner of O and 25th streets in Havana for planning the revolution. Abel and Haydee participated in the Moncada barracks assault in July 1953 that was intended to start the revolutionary overthrow of Cuban dictator Fulgencio Batista. Fidel Castro assigned Santamaria with the mission of taking the Saturnino Lora Hospital as part of the assault. Santamaria initially objected with the thought that Castro was taking on the more dangerous mission, stating "you are most needed by everyone". Castro responded, "I am going to the garrison and you go to the hospital, because you are the soul of this movement, and if I die, you will take my place." The assault ultimately failed and both Abel and Haydée were imprisoned with many other revolutionaries. Abel was murdered in prison in Santiago de Cuba after being tortured by police to reveal the location where the other revolutionaries were hiding. It is said that the police removed Abel's eyes and showed them to Haydée, but she never revealed where the revolutionaries were.

The Abel Santamaría Airport in Santa Clara, Cuba is named for him.

== See also ==
- Museo Abel Santamaría Cuadrado
- Villa Clara Provincial Museum
