= Attack on the Moncada Barracks =

1953 attack starting the Cuban Revolution

Coordinates: 20°01′35″N 75°49′09″W

- Part of the Cuban Revolution
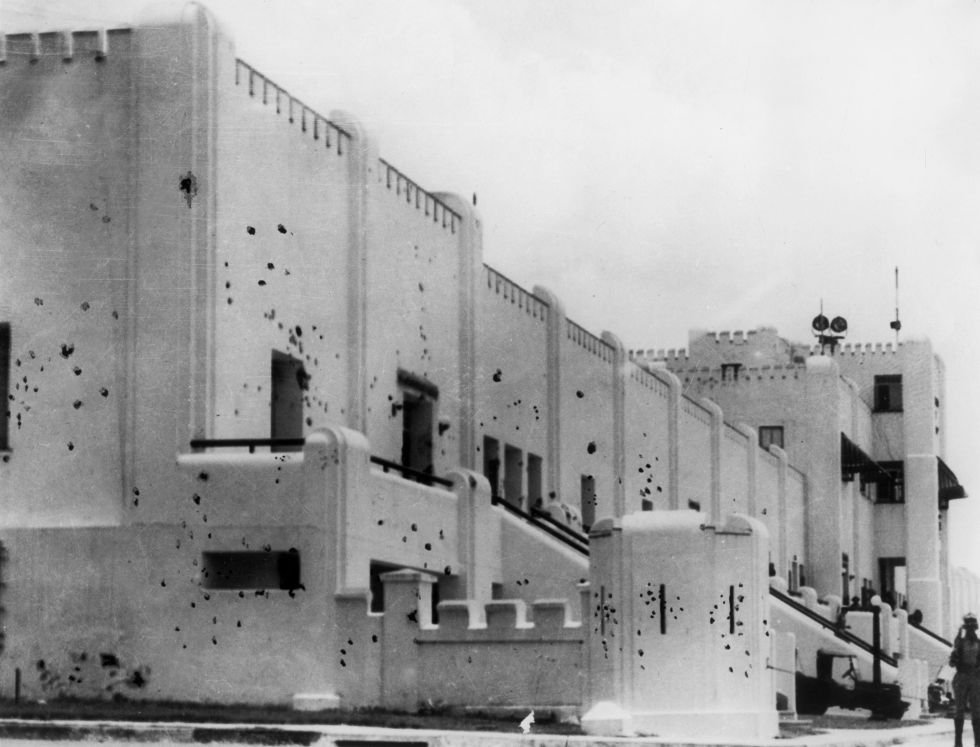
- Damage on the Moncada Barracks after the attack.
Date	26 July 1953
Location	Santiago de Cuba, Cuba
Result	Government victory: Rebels forced to retreat

Belligerents
Republic of Cuba	The Movement; Partido Ortodoxo

Commanders and leaders
Alberto del Rio Chaviano	Fidel Castro; Abel Santamaría (executed); Lester Rodriguez

Strength
400	136 (additional 24 in Bayamo)

Casualties and losses
19 killed (1 in Bayamo); 30 wounded (2 in Bayamo)	61 killed (10 executed in Bayamo); 57 prosecuted (6 in absentia)

The Moncada Barracks were military barracks in Santiago de Cuba, Cuba, named after General Guillermo Moncada, a hero of the Cuban War of Independence. On 26 July 1953, the barracks was the site of an armed attack by a small group of revolutionaries led by Fidel Castro. That day a simultaneous attack was carried out on the Carlos M. de Céspedes Barracks in Bayamo directed by Raúl Martínez Ararás by order of Castro. The attack failed and the surviving revolutionaries were imprisoned. This armed attack is widely accepted as the beginning of the Cuban Revolution. The date on which the attack took place, 26 July, was adopted by Castro as the name for his revolutionary movement, Movimiento 26 Julio (abbreviated as M-26-7), which eventually toppled the dictatorship of Fulgencio Batista on 1 January 1959.

== Preparation ==
Almost all of Fidel Castro's followers were Partido Ortodoxo Youth rank and file of the lower middle class and working class. Of the 136 insurgents whose ages are known, the average age was 26, the same as that of Castro. Nine rebels were in their teens, 96 were in their twenties, 27 in their thirties, and five over 40. The Afro-Cuban composition of the group was limited to two Africans and 12 Cubans of partial African ancestry, partly because most biracial Cubans identified with Batista, who was of mixed blood. Only two of the group were women, Haydée Santamaría and Melba Hernández, both of whom went on to become politicians.

After Batista's military coup on 10 March 1952, Fidel Castro and his group began to train young men to engage in the struggle, along with other anti-Batista groups, against an illegitimate government. Castro claimed that they trained 1,200 men within a few months, training at the University of Havana and at firing ranges in Havana, disguising themselves as businessmen interested in hunting and clay pigeon shooting.

The weapons included 40 12- and 16-gauge shotguns, 35 Mosberg and Remington .22 rifles, 60 handguns of various models, a malfunctioning .45 caliber submachine gun, 24 rifles of different caliber, including eight Model 1898 Krag–Jørgensen rifles, a .30-06 Model 1903 Springfield rifle, three sawed-off 1892 .44-caliber Winchester rifles, and a .30 caliber M1 Carbine with a folding metal stock.

Fidel Castro decided that army uniforms were needed for the Moncada attack. He discussed this with Calabazar cell leader Pedro Trigo Lopez (es), who suggested approaching his relative Florentino Fernández León, a 26-year-old military hospital orderly in Jaimanitas. Fernandez agreed and received $200 to purchase surplus uniforms, weapons, and ammunition. He then pilfered from the military hospital laundry most of the blue uniforms needed to attire the rebels.

The night before the attack, the men gathered at a farm in Siboney, where they learned what the objective was.

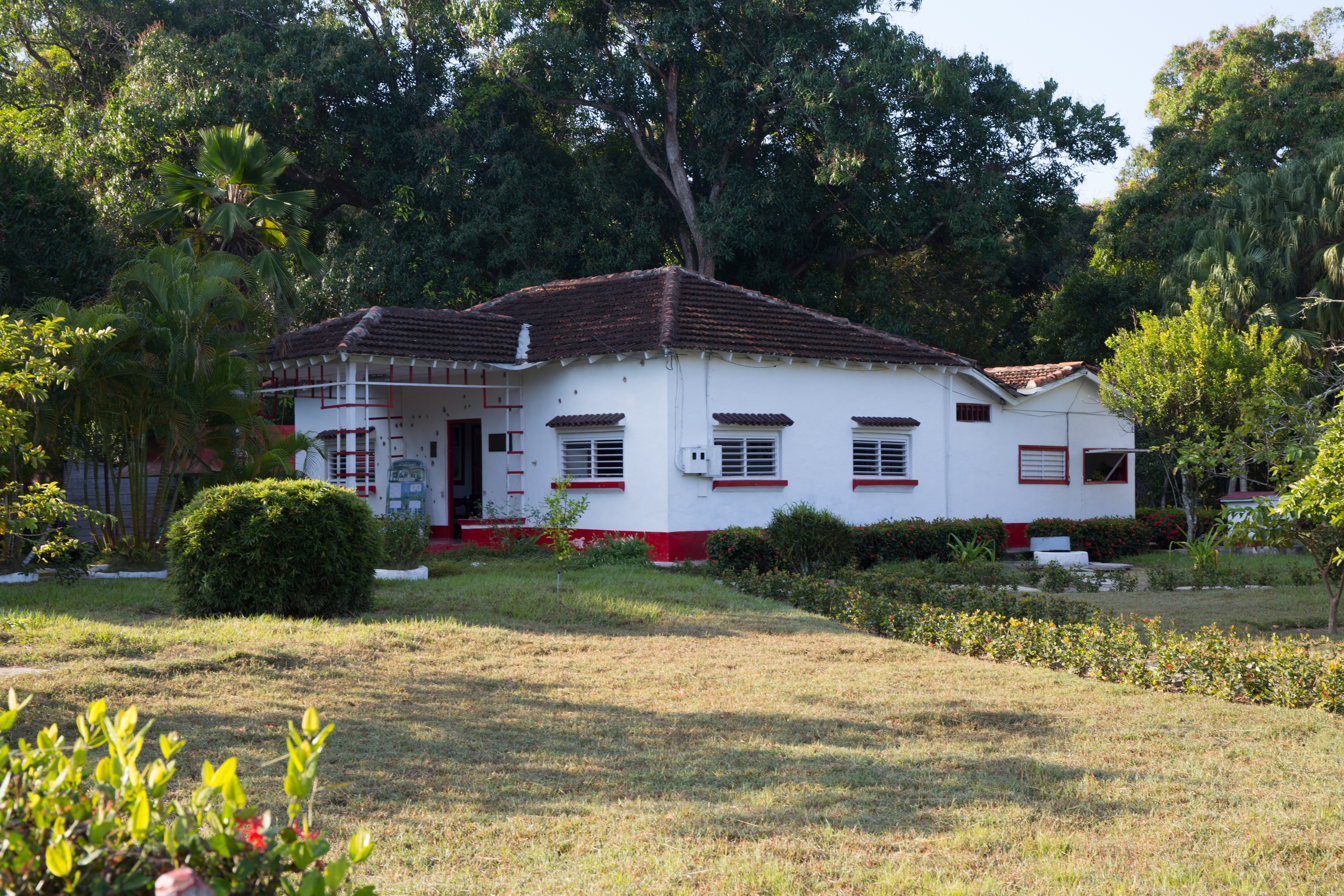
Granjita Siboney

The plan was to secure the barracks and gain possession of the weapons stored within, and to use the building's army communications equipment to spread false messages for several hours to confuse the military. In the meantime, the weapons would be removed and hidden throughout the city to use in the continuing struggle, and Santiago's radio station would be taken to broadcast the speeches of Eduardo Chibás, in order to mobilize the public with the ultimate aim of bringing down the Batista government.

The men left the farm at 4:45 am on 26 July 1953, planning to attack at dawn. The date of the attack was specifically chosen because the fiestas in Santiago are held on 25 July.

== The attack ==
On 26 July 1953, at 5:15 am, Fidel Castro led a group of 136 rebels (with an additional 24 intending to take the barracks at Bayamo), including his brother Raúl, in an attack on the second largest military garrison; commanded by Colonel Alberto del Rio Chaviano.

The group formed a 16-automobile caravan in order to give the appearance of being a delegation headed by a high-ranking officer sent from western Cuba. Their plan was that a first group of 25 men led by Abel Santamaría would take the civilian hospital at the rear of the barracks, a second group of 6 men led by Lester Rodriguez, including Raúl Castro (Fidel's brother), would take the Audiencia Building (Palacio de Justicia), and a third group of 90 men, led by Castro, would take the barracks, including the radio transmitter within it.

The attack began poorly. The caravan of automobiles became separated by the time it arrived at the barracks, and the car carrying the guerrillas' heavy weapons got lost. Furthermore, many of the rebels who would have taken part in the attack were left behind for a lack of weapons. In Castro's autobiography, he claims that he drove his car into a group of soldiers at the gate who had realized an attack was in progress. The men in the cars behind him jumped out of their cars, believing they were inside the barracks, and the alarm was sounded before the barracks had been infiltrated. According to Castro, this was the fatal mistake in the operation.

Fifteen soldiers and three policemen were killed and 23 soldiers and five policemen wounded during the attack to the Moncada Barracks. Nine rebels were killed in combat, 11 wounded, four of them by friendly fire, and 42 executed later. In the attack on Carlos M. de Cespedes Barracks, one soldier died and two were wounded. Later the Cuban Army executed ten fugitive attackers. (According to Fidel Castro five were killed in the attack on the Moncada Barracks, and 56 were executed later by the Batista regime in the attack on the Moncada Barracks and the Bayamo Barracks) Eighteen rebels captured in the Civil Hospital were immediately executed in the Moncada small-arms target range within two hours after the attack. Their corpses were strewn throughout the garrison to simulate death in combat. Thirty-four fleeing rebels captured during the next three days were murdered after admitting their participation. A handful of rebels, including Fidel Castro, escaped into the nearby countryside but were apprehended shortly thereafter.

== Trial ==
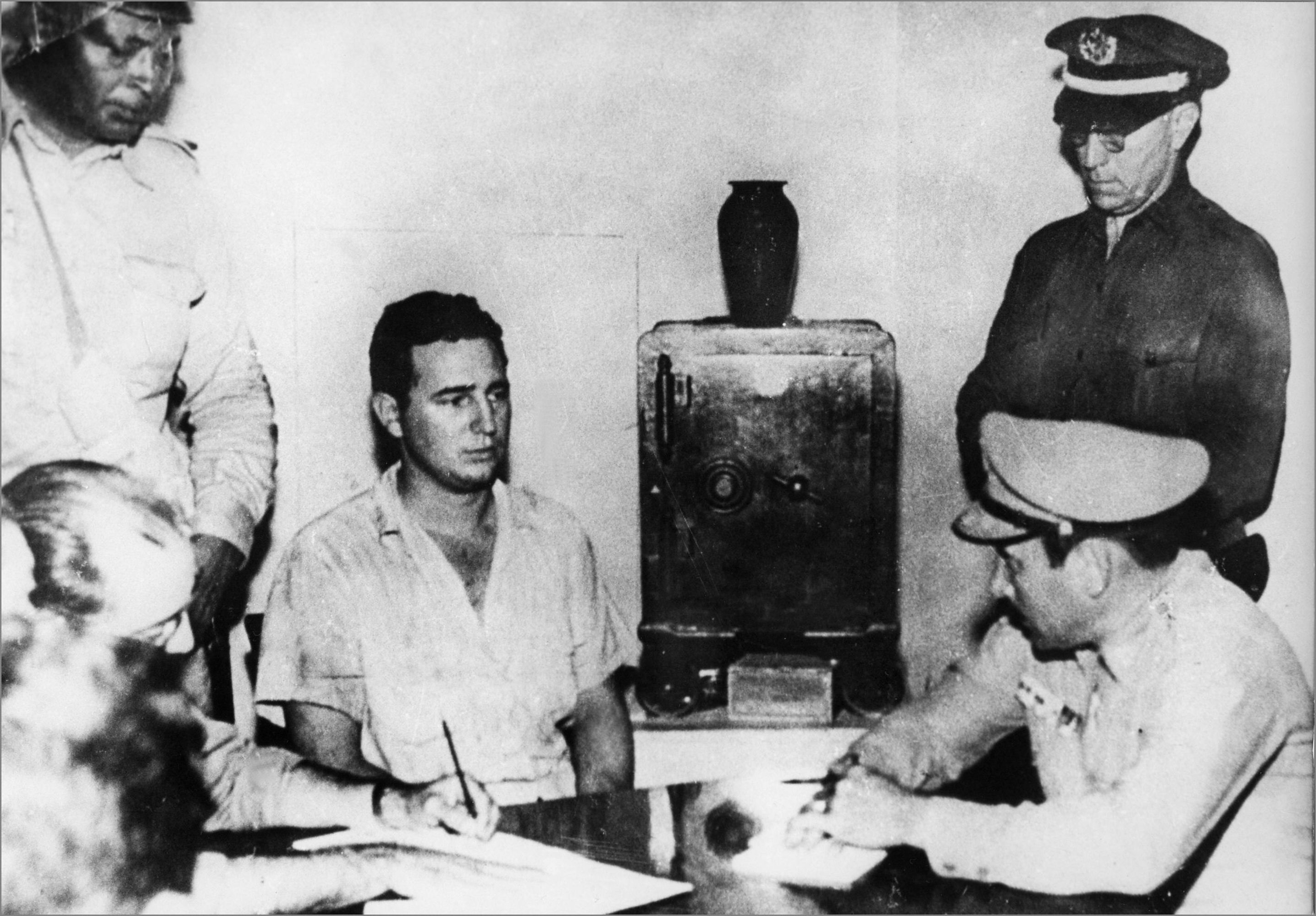
Fidel Castro in custody after the Moncada attack

The Santiago de Cuba Urgency Tribunal indicted 122 defendants in Case 37 of 1953 to stand trial for 26 July insurrection. Fifty-one of the 99 rebel survivors who were captured were remanded for trial. Six indicted rebels remained in hiding. The other 65 defendants implicated throughout the island were mostly political leaders and opposition activists not involved in the rebellion. Fifteen of them, including deposed President Carlos Prío Socarrás, Aureliano Sánchez Arango, José Pardo Llada, and Communist leader Blas Roca, were underground or in exile and never went to court.

The trial in the Santiago de Cuba Palace of Justice began on 21 September 1953 and ended on 6 October 1953, after 11 sessions. The Cuban Civil Code of Justice, based on the Napoleonic Code practiced in Europe and Latin America, has the verdict determined by a panel of three judges rather than by a jury of peers as under "common law" in the U.S. and Great Britain. In accordance, after the accused heard the charges against them, they were called to testify on their own behalf. The defendants were represented by 24 attorneys. Fidel Castro assumed his own defense and lied under oath to avoid implicating rebels on trial. During the questioning of rebel witnesses, Castro raised accusations of the murder of prisoners by the military. In consequence, Moncada chief Col. Alberto del Rio Chaviano, impeded Castro from returning to court by claiming that he could not attend due to illness. The tribunal then separated Castro from the proceedings and granted him a separate trial. Nineteen rebels were found not guilty based on lack of evidence and their false testimony. Confessed leaders Raúl Castro, Oscar Alcalde, Pedro Miret, and Ernesto Tizol received 13-year prison sentences. Twenty other rebels received 10-year sentences. Rebels Manuel Lorenzo, Eduardo Rodriguez, and Orlando Cortez Gallardo, who refused to participate in the attack at the last moment, got three-year sentences. Dr. Melba Hernandez Rodriguez del Rey and Haydée Santamaría were given seven-month sentences since it was never proven that they handled weapons.

Castro, a qualified lawyer, used his time in prison to write a speech entitled "History Will Absolve Me", which included part of his defense statement delivered during his sentencing; he received a 15-year sentence. A copy of the speech was smuggled page by page out of prison (Presidio Modelo). A friend from the 26 July attack, Haydée Santamaría later published it.

== Aftermath ==
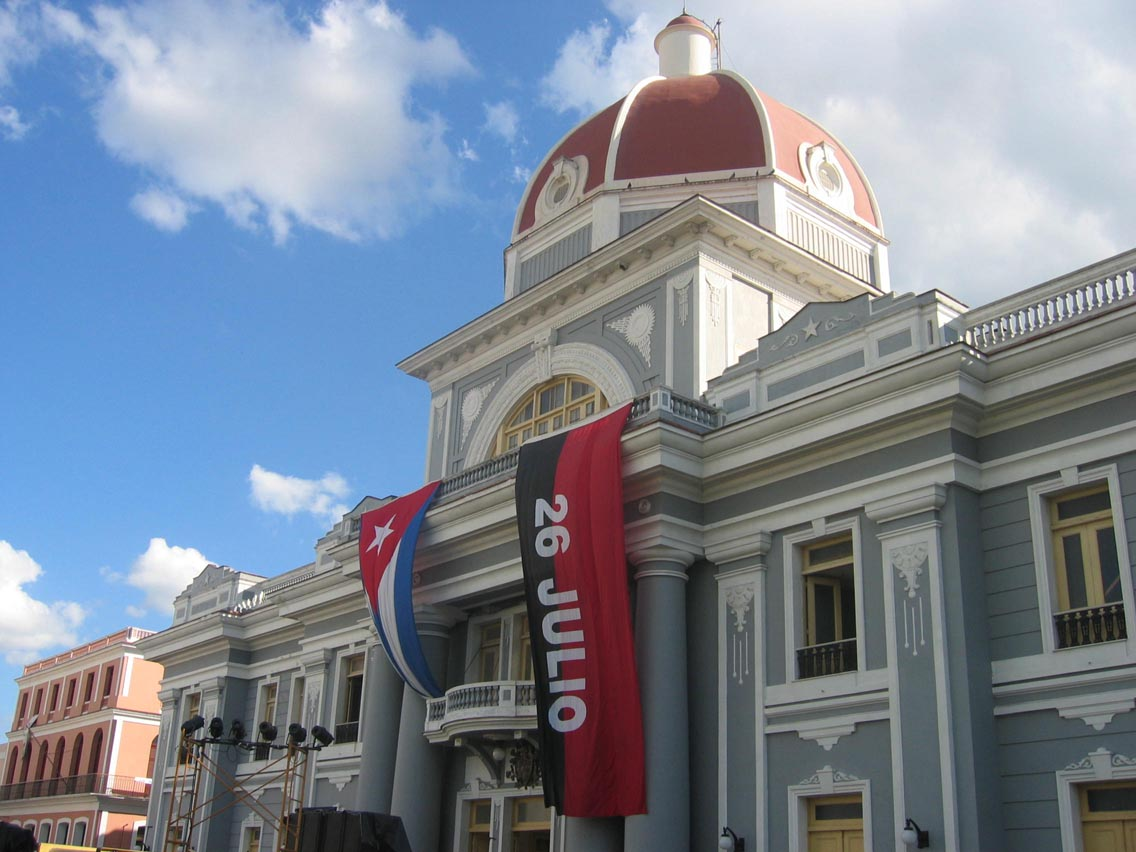
A memorial of the attacks in Cienfuegos

Two years later, in 1955, the mothers of some prisoners launched a campaign to free Castro and the other rebels imprisoned with him. As popular support for the rebels and opposition to Batista's rule mounted, a group of political leaders, editors, and intellectuals signed a public appeal demanding liberty for the prisoners. That year, the Cuban Congress passed a bill granting general amnesty to political prisoners. After the bill was signed by Batista, the 30 imprisoned rebels were freed. They served 22 months in prison.

The battle damage to the Moncada barracks was quickly repaired by the military. After the revolution, it was converted into a school on January 28, 1960. Three weeks earlier, Fidel Castro personally drove the bulldozer that demolished the crenelated outer walls. In 1978, Castro ordered the massive perimeter walls rebuilt and converted half of the main building into the July 26 Historical Museum.

== See also ==
- Guillermo Moncada, the barracks' namesake
