= Uvero =

- Village
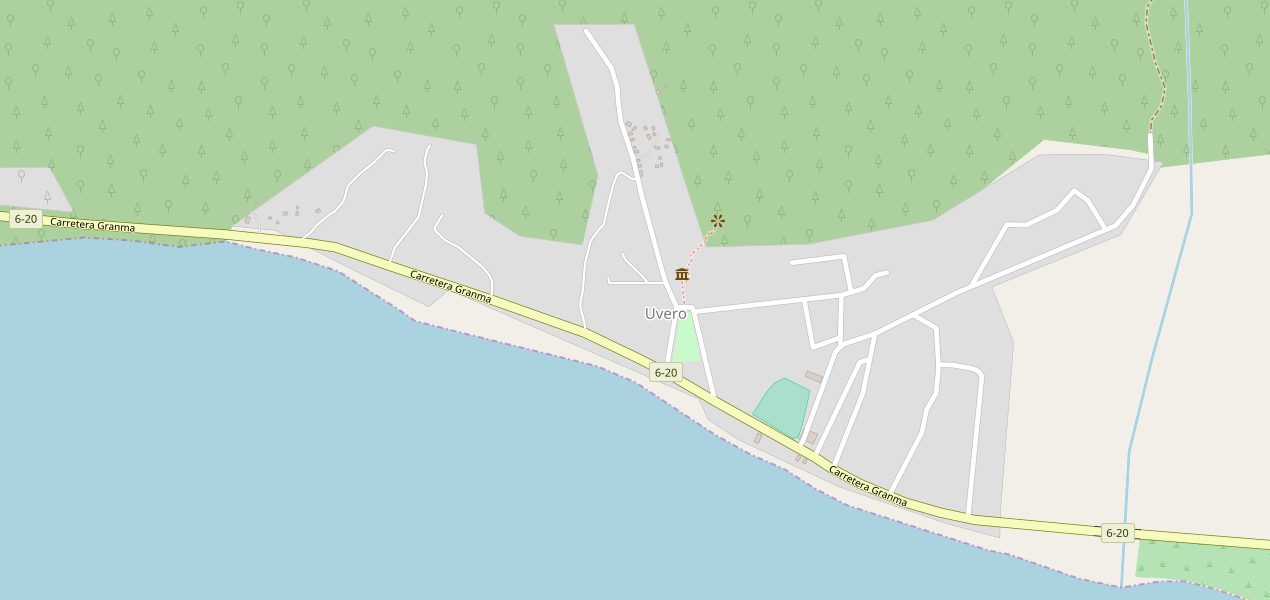
- OSM map showing Uvero

- Location of Uvero in Cuba
- Coordinates: 19°56′57.3″N 76°35′24.2″W
- Country: Cuba
- Province: Santiago de Cuba
- Municipality: Guamá
- Founded: 18th century
- Elevation: 10 m (33 ft)

Population (2011)
  - Total: 2,581
- Time zone: UTC-5 (EST)
- Area code: +53-226

Uvero, also known as El Uvero, is a Cuban village and consejo popular ("people's council", i.e. hamlet) of the municipality of Guamá, in Santiago de Cuba Province. In 2011 it had a population of 2,581.

== History ==
The toponym derives from the Spanish common name of some species of Coccoloba, a genus of trees, found by Spanish explorers, at the entrance of the village, in the 18th century. On May 28, 1957, during the Cuban Revolution, the village was the site of a battle, between a column of M-26-7 rebels, led by Fidel Castro, and a garrison of the Cuban Army.

== Geography ==
Located by the Caribbean Coast, below the Sierra Maestra mountain range, Uvero spans along the "Carretera del Granma" highway (part of the Circuito Sur de Oriente), between Chivirico (the municipal seat, 22 km east) and Pilón (in Granma Province, 80 km west), in a sparsely populated coastal strip.

The village, included in Turquino National Park's territory, is about 26 km east of Pico Turquino, the highest Cuban peak. It is 74 km east of Marea del Portillo, 96 km west of Santiago de Cuba and 127 km east of Niquero. Nearest villages are, to the west, La Uvita (15 km) and Ocujal (23 km); to the east Guamá Abajo (18 km).

== See also ==
- Municipalities of Cuba
- List of cities in Cuba
