= Media Luna, Cuba =

Media Luna
- Municipality
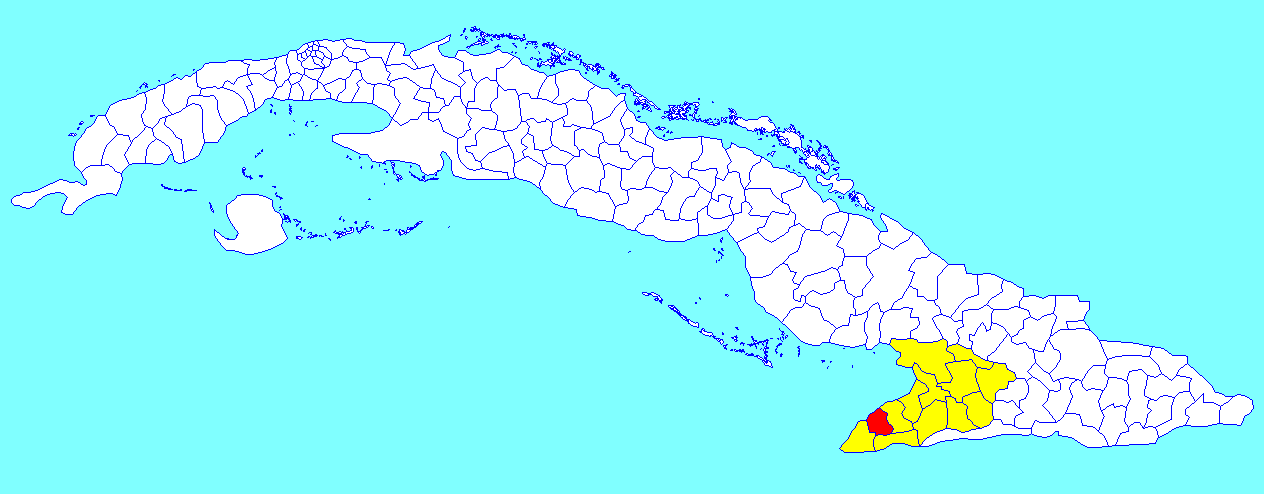
- Media Luna municipality (red) within Granma Province (yellow) and Cuba
- Coordinates: 20°08′40″N 77°26′10″W
- Country: Cuba
- Province: Granma

Area
  - Total: 376 km^{2} (145 sq mi)
- Elevation: 0 m (0 ft)

Population (2022)
  - Total: 31,589
  - Density: 84.0/km^{2} (218/sq mi)
- Time zone: UTC-5 (EST)
- Area code: +53-23
- Website: https://www.medialuna.gob.cu/es/

Media Luna (Spanish pronunciation: [ˈmeðja luna]; lit. 'Half Moon') is a town and municipality in the Granma Province of Cuba. It is located on the coastal region of the province, bordering the Gulf of Guacanayabo, between Niquero and Campechuela.

== Demographics ==
In 2022, the municipality of Media Luna had a population of 31,589. With a total area of 376 km^{2} (145 sq mi), it has a population density of 94.0/km^{2} (243/sq mi).

== Transport ==
The town is crossed by the state highway "Circuito Sur de Oriente" (CSO).

== See also ==
- Municipalities of Cuba
- List of cities in Cuba
