= Circuito Sur de Oriente =

Highway in Cuba

Coordinates: 20°22′01.6″N 76°38′32.2″W

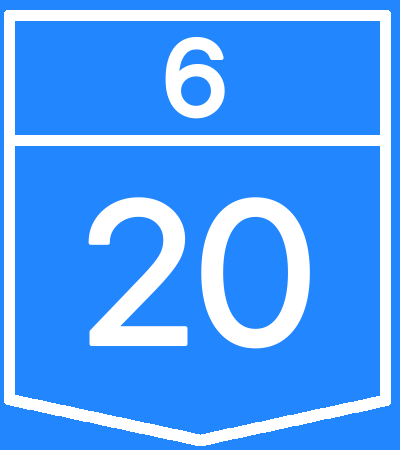
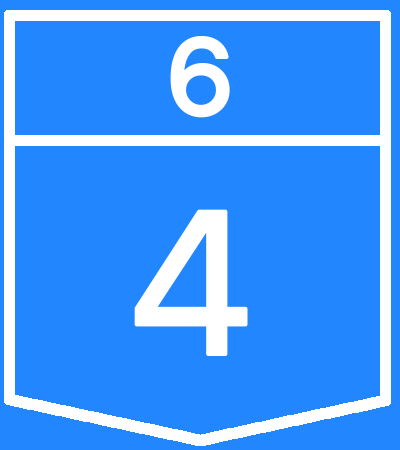
6–20 (Carretera Granma) 6–4 (Carretera a Manzanillo) Circuito Sur de Oriente (CSO)
- Southern Circuit of the Orient
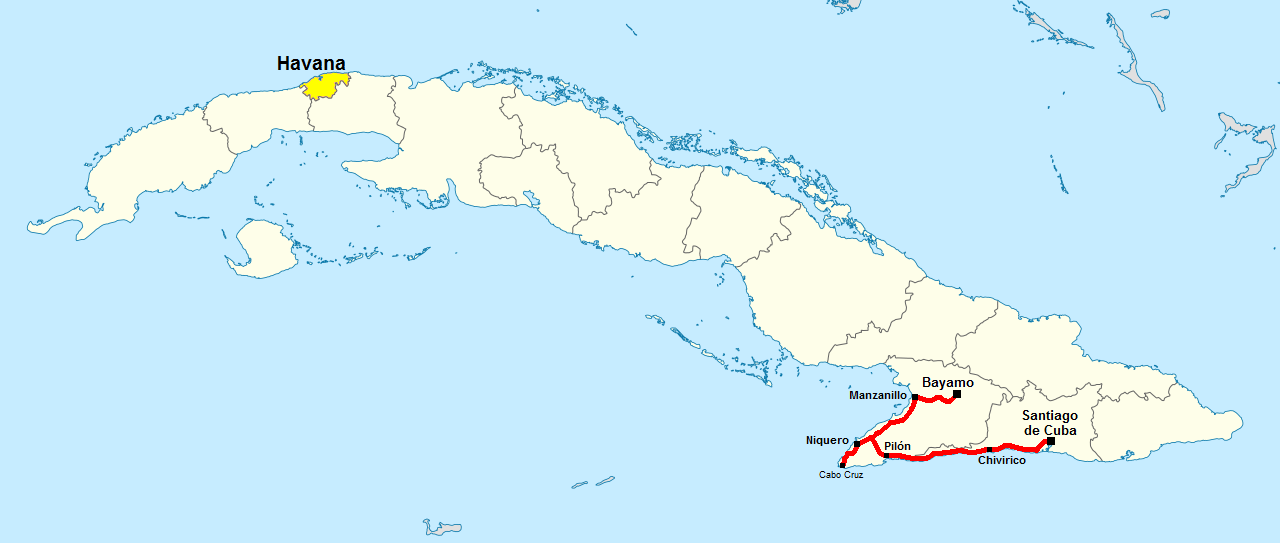

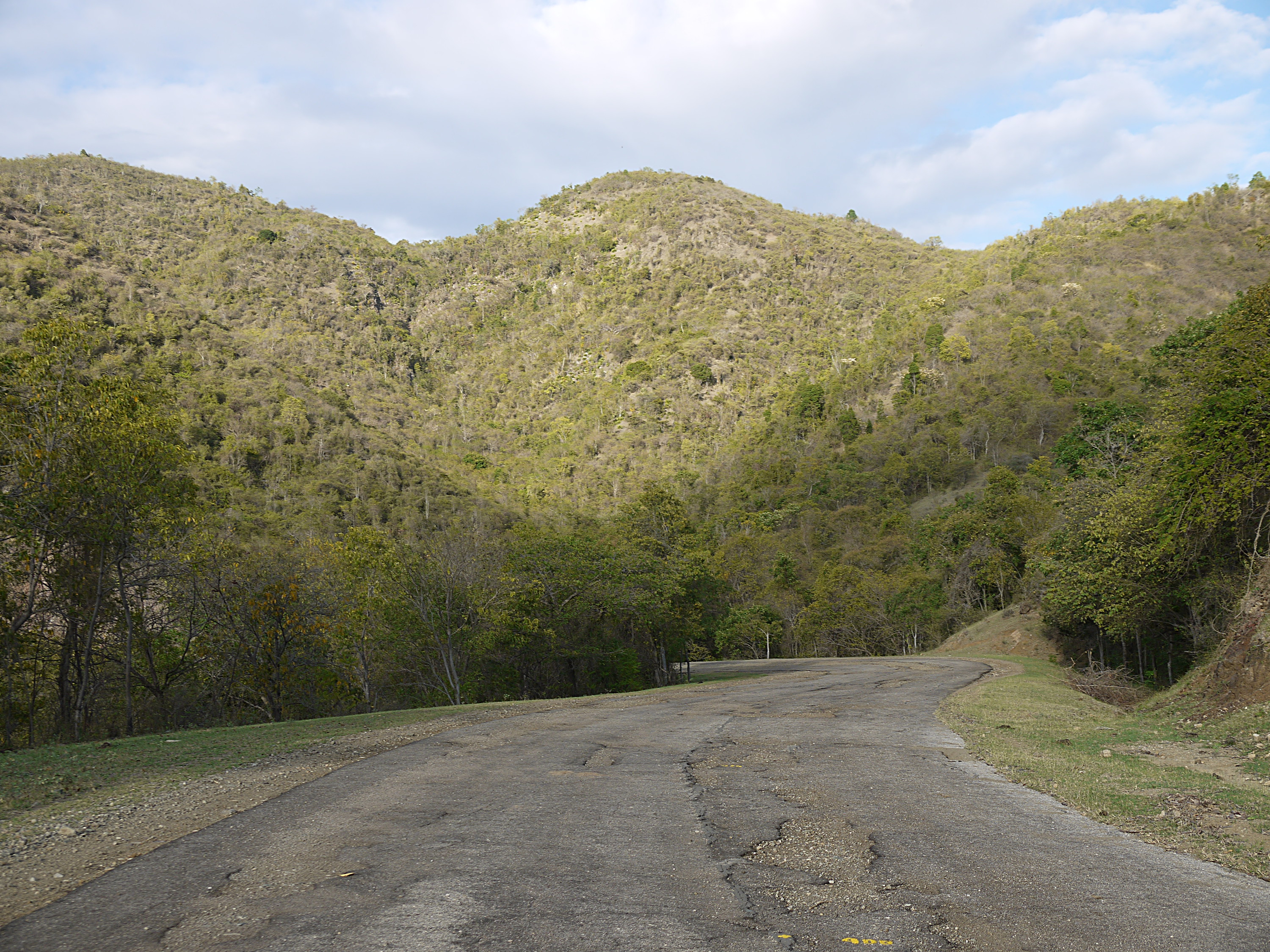
- The CSO across the municipality of Guamá with the Sierra Maestra in background

Route information
- Length: 347 km (216 mi)

6–4
- East end: Bayamo Beltway
- Major intersections: Bayamo–Montero Road; 6–122; 6–76; Bayamo–Montero Road (under construction); 6–20
- West end: Cabo Cruz

6–20
- West end: 6–4
- East end: CC

Location
- Country: Cuba
- Major cities: Bayamo, Manzanillo, Campechuela, Niquero, Pilón, Chivirico, Santiago de Cuba

Highway system
- Roads in Cuba

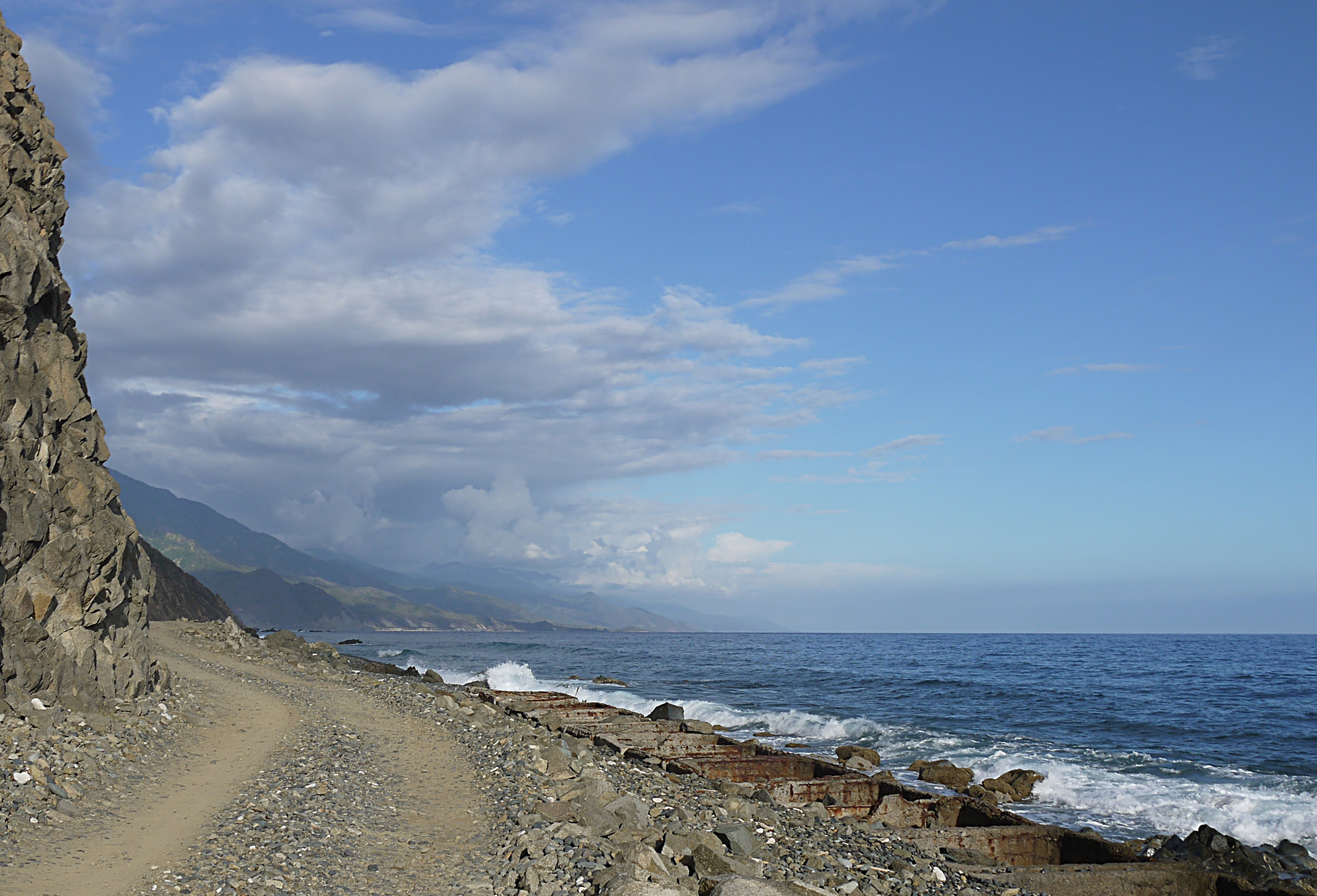
The CSO across the coastline of Guamá

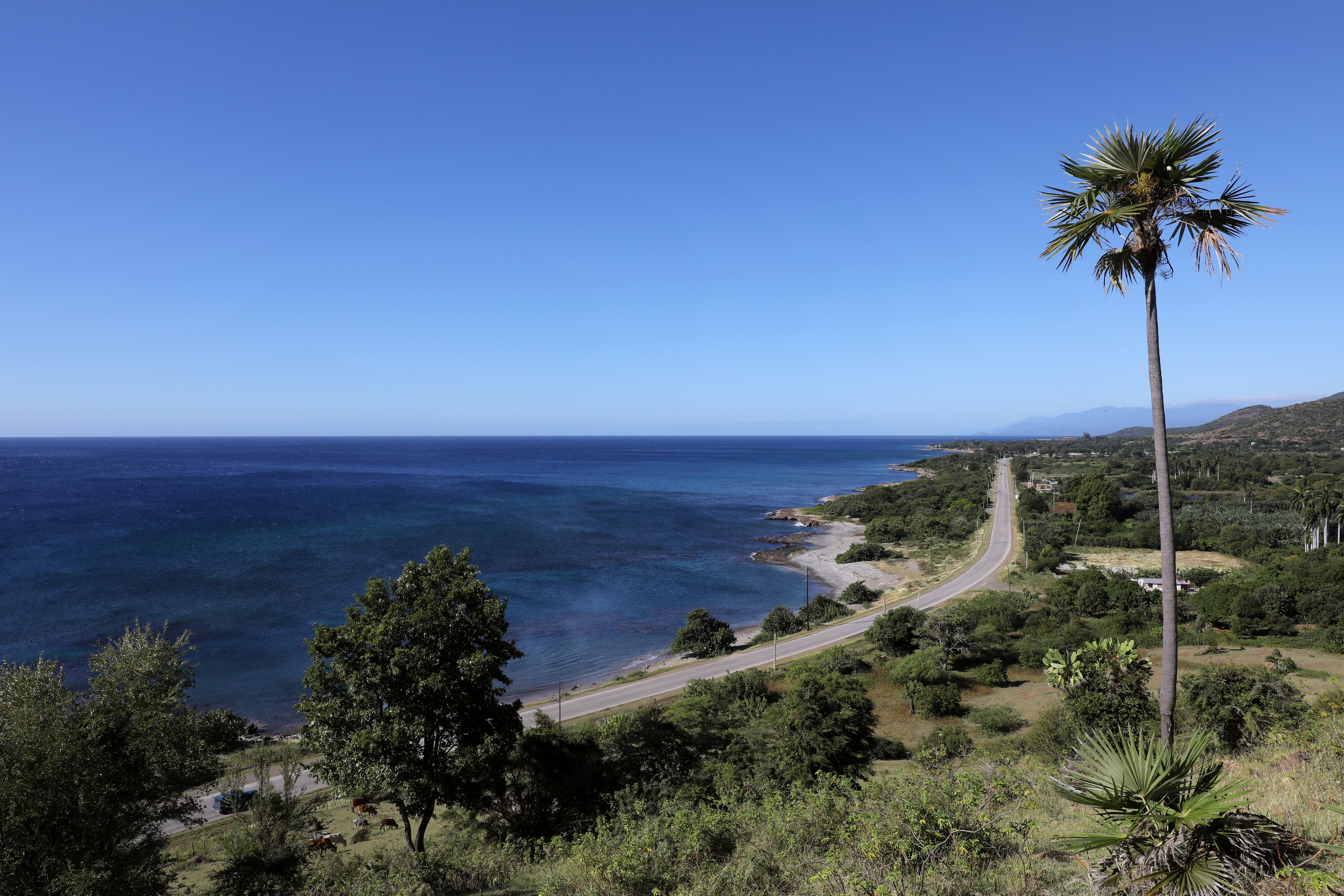
The CSO east of Caleton blanco, Guama

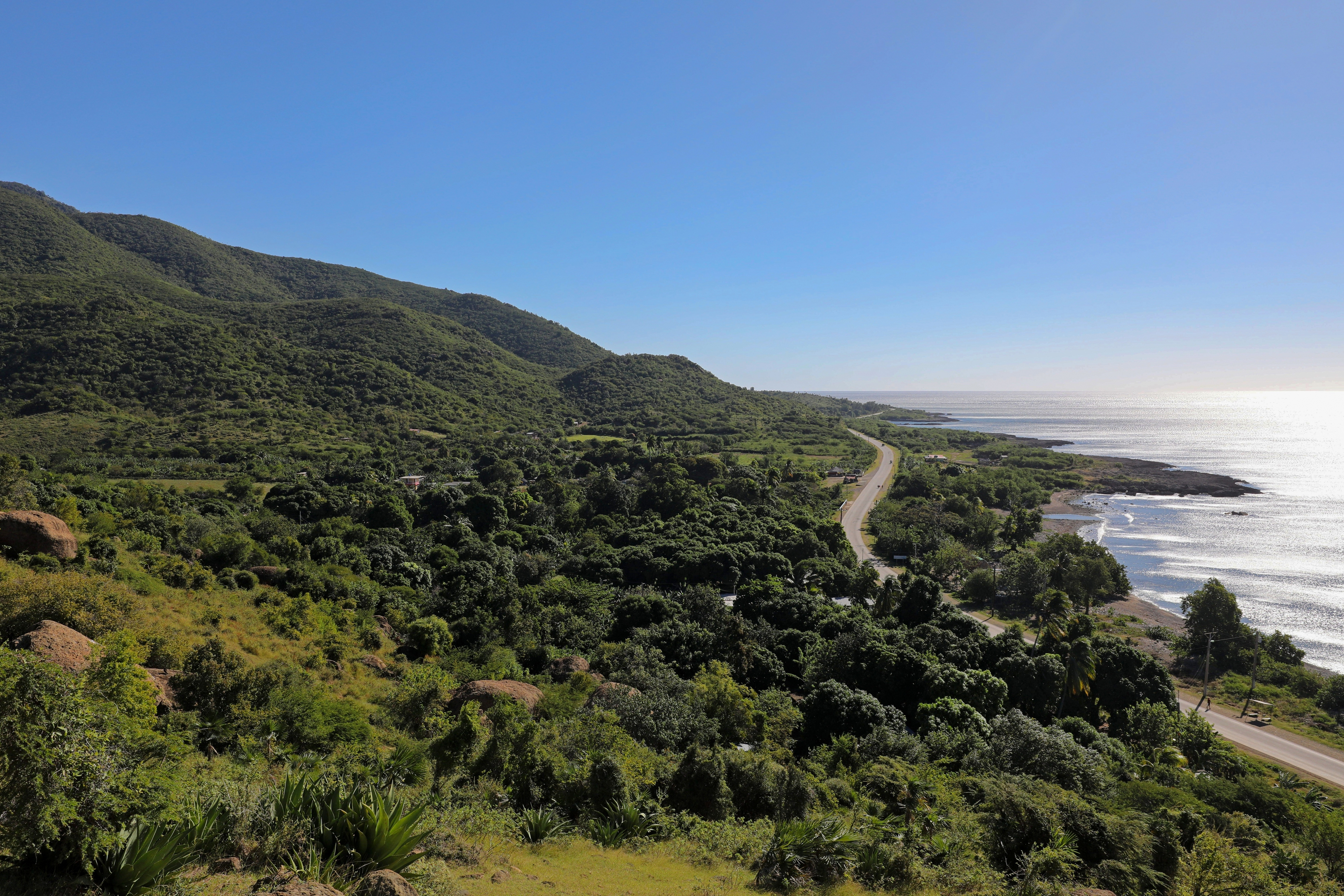
The CSO at Cañizo, Guama

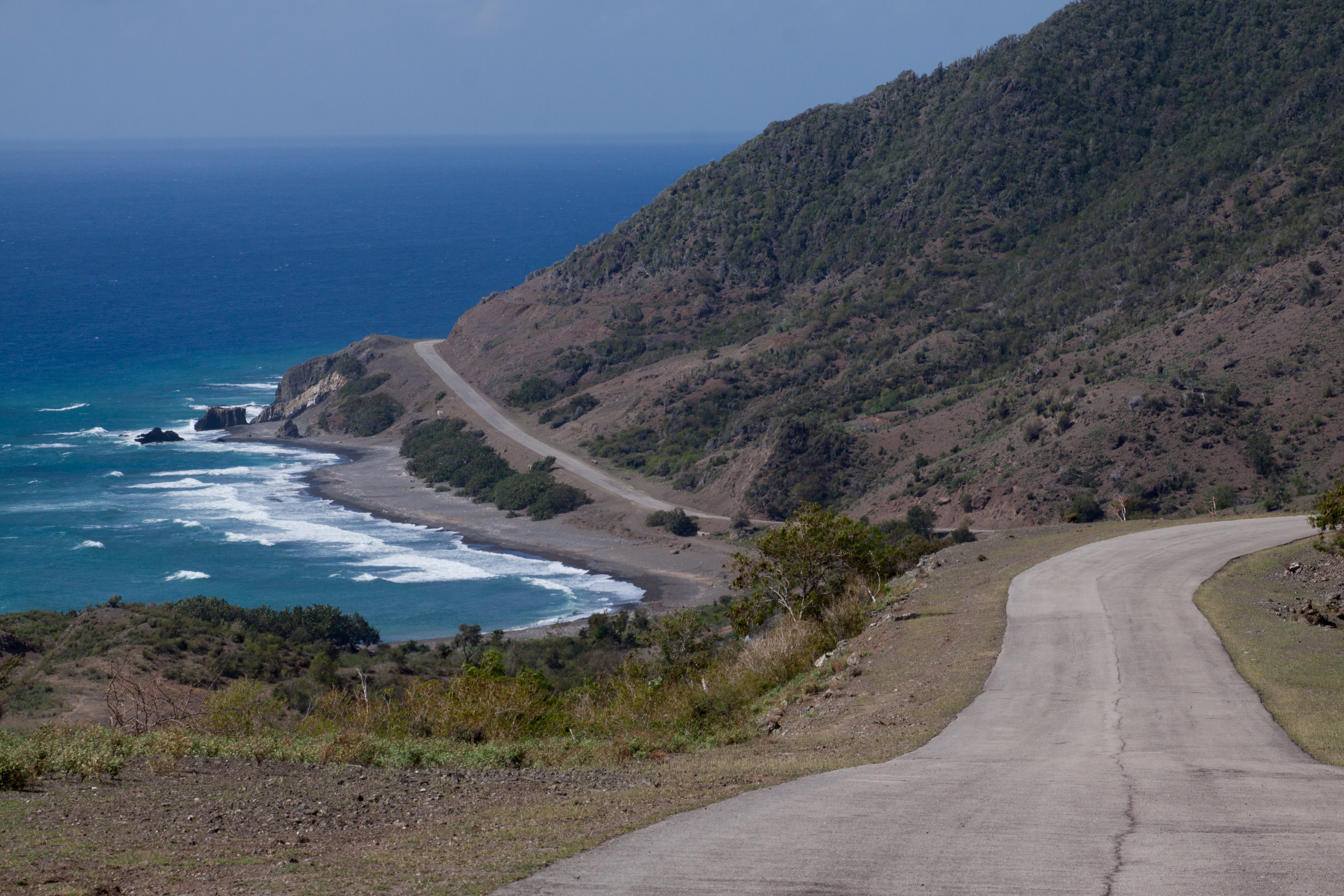
The CSO east of Mota, Pilón

The Circuito Sur de Oriente (CSO), meaning "Southern Circuit of the Orient", is a west-east highway connecting Bayamo to Santiago de Cuba, through Manzanillo, Niquero and the southern coastal side of eastern Cuba, below the Sierra Maestra mountain range. Also known as Circuito Guacanayabo-Sur de Oriente, because it crosses the Gulf of Guacanayabo, the name Oriente (meaning "Orient"), refers to the ancient and former Oriente Province. With a length of 347 km, it is the fourth-longest Cuban highway after the "Carretera Central", the "Circuito Norte" and the "Circuito Sur".

== Route ==
=== Description ===
The CSO, whose endpoints cross the Carretera Central, starts in Bayamo, capital of Granma Province, and ends in Santiago, the second Cuban city and capital of Santiago de Cuba Province. It is divided into a pair of Carretera branches:

- The **6-4**, also known as "Carretera a Manzanillo", "Carretera a Campechuela" and "Carretera a Niquero", runs From Bayamo to a fork to Niquero via Yara, Manzanillo, Campechuela and Media Luna. It crosses the shore of the Gulf of Guacanayabo, and the section to Niquero centre continues to Cape Cruz, through Playa Las Coloradas, in Desembarco del Granma National Park.
- The **6-20**, also known as "Carretera de Pilón" and "**Carretera Granma**", runs from the fork to Niquero to Santiago de Cuba, through Pilón, Marea del Portillo, Uvero and Chivirico (seat of Guamá municipality). It runs at almost along the coastline, below the Sierra Maestra mountain range and the Turquino National Park.

=== Table ===
The table below shows the route of the Circuito Sur de Oriente. Note: Provincial seats are shown in bold; the names shown under brackets in the section "Municipality" indicate the municipal seats.

Settlement	Municipality	Province
**Bayamo**	(Bayamo)	Granma
Santa Rosa (to El Dátil)	Bayamo	Granma
William Soler (crossroad)	Bayamo	Granma
Solis	Bayamo	Granma
El Dorado (University of Granma)	Bayamo	Granma
Peralejo	Bayamo	Granma
Entronque Bueycito (to Bueycito)	Bayamo	Granma
Barranca (to Julia-Mabay)	Bayamo	Granma
Los Cayos	Yara	Granma
Repelón	Yara	Granma
Macuto	Yara	Granma
Veguitas	Yara	Granma
Sofía (crossroad)	Yara	Granma
Yara	(Yara)	Granma
Coboa	Yara	Granma
Cayo Redondo	Yara	Granma
Las Novillas	Manzanillo	Granma
Blanquizal	Manzanillo	Granma
Manzanillo	(Manzanillo)	Granma
San Francisco	Manzanillo	Granma
El Congo	Manzanillo	Granma
Los Letreros	Manzanillo	Granma
La Demajagua (crossroad)	Manzanillo	Granma
San Antonio	Manzanillo	Granma
Calicito (to Troya)	Manzanillo	Granma
Israel Licea	Campechuela	Granma
El Puntico	Campechuela	Granma
Campechuela	(Campechuela)	Granma
Ceiba Hueca	Campechuela	Granma
San Ramón	Campechuela	Granma
Media Luna	(Media Luna)	Granma
San Diego	Media Luna	Granma
Entronque Niquero-Pilón (to Niquero)	Media Luna	Granma
**Media Luna–Niquero–Cabo Cruz fork section** (start)
Entronque Niquero-Pilón (to Pilón)	Media Luna	Granma
Santa Isabel	Niquero	Granma
Jagua	Niquero	Granma
Niquero	(Niquero)	Granma
Guanito	Niquero	Granma
Hondón	Niquero	Granma
Marea de Limones	Niquero	Granma
Marea de Belic	Niquero	Granma
Belic	Niquero	Granma
Palma de la Cruz	Niquero	Granma
Playa Las Coloradas	Niquero	Granma
Cabo Cruz	Niquero	Granma
**Media Luna–Niquero–Cabo Cruz fork section** (end)
Entronque Niquero-Pilón (to Niquero)	Media Luna	Granma
La Junta	Media Luna	Granma
Blanca Rosa	Media Luna	Granma
Sevilla Arriba	Pilón	Granma
La Alegría	Pilón	Granma
Pilón	(Pilón)	Granma
Saturnino	Pilón	Granma
Punta de Piedra	Pilón	Granma
Marea del Portillo	Pilón	Granma
Mota	Pilón	Granma
Buenavista (crossroad)	Pilón	Granma
El Macho	Guamá	Santiago
La Magdalena	Guamá	Santiago
La Plata	Guamá	Santiago
Las Cuevas	Guamá	Santiago
Ocujal	Guamá	Santiago
La Mula	Guamá	Santiago
La Uvita	Guamá	Santiago
Uvero	Guamá	Santiago
Guamá Abajo	Guamá	Santiago
Chivirico	(Guamá)	Santiago
Cayo Damas	Guamá	Santiago
Quiebra Seca	Guamá	Santiago
Río Seco	Guamá	Santiago
El Francés	Guamá	Santiago
Aserradero	Guamá	Santiago
Dos Ríos	Guamá	Santiago
Caletón Blanco	Guamá	Santiago
Cañizo	Guamá	Santiago
Juan González	Guamá	Santiago
Buey Cabón	Guamá	Santiago
Mar Verde	Santiago de Cuba	Santiago
Oanones	Santiago de Cuba	Santiago
El Carmen (to El Cobre and Parada)	Santiago de Cuba	Santiago
**Santiago de Cuba**	(Santiago de Cuba)	Santiago

== See also ==
- Roads in Cuba
- Circuito Sur
