= Guama =

Guama can refer to:

== People ==
- Guamá, a Taíno cacique who led a rebellion against the Spanish rule in Cuba in the 1530s

== Places ==
- Guama, Brazil, a small town in the state of Pará in Brazil,
- Guamá, Cuba, a municipality in Santiago de Cuba Province, Cuba
- Guama, Venezuela, a town in Yaracuy state, Venezuela
- Guamá, San Germán, Puerto Rico, a barrio in the San Germán municipality of Puerto Rico (U.S.)

== Plants ==
- Guama, Spanish name of Inga edulis (Ice-cream-bean) in South America.
