= Cienfuegos uprising =

The Cienfuegos uprising was an armed rebellion on 5 September 1957 in the Cuban port city of Cienfuegos, involving dissident sailors, 26th of July Movement fighters, and civilian supporters against the government of Fulgencio Batista. It was the first significant defection of Batista's military forces to the rebel cause during the Cuban Revolution and resulted in a brief rebel control of the city before army units with tanks and aircraft suppressed the revolt.

== Background ==
Since December 1956, the 26th of July Movement had been waging a guerrilla campaign in the Sierra Maestra mountains under Fidel Castro, and by mid‑1957 it sought to open new fronts by triggering uprisings in the cities, coordinating with their sympathizers inside the armed forces. Cienfuegos, a major south‑central port of about 60,000 people, housed the South Naval District and was a key transportation hub.

In the weeks before the uprising, a series of bombings and armed incidents had occurred across the island, and Batista had suspended constitutional guarantees. The rebel plan aimed to seize the city’s naval post, police headquarters, and communications, part of a larger scheme that included actions in Havana and Santiago de Cuba. After earlier target dates in April and May fell through because of technical failures and security concerns, the operation was set for 5 September; however, when leaders ordered yet another postponement, word never reached the Cienfuegos cell, and the conspirators attacked on the date they believed was still in effect.

== Uprising ==
At dawn on 5 September 1957, about 200 sailors and corporals from the Cienfuegos naval garrison mutinied, seizing the naval station and imprisoning pro‑Batista officers. They distributed weapons from the arsenal to a waiting force of approximately 60 maritime police and some 200 armed civilians aligned with the 26th of July Movement. The combined rebel force moved into the city center, surrounding the national police headquarters in Martí Park and demanding surrender. When the police refused, the rebels attacked, and after a firefight that left casualties in the streets, the building fell.

By noon, the rebels controlled Cienfuegos—the first city to fall to anti‑Batista forces since the failed 1956 Santiago de Cuba uprising in November the previous year. It was also the first time uniformed members of Cuba’s armed forces had openly joined the insurrection.

== Government counterattack ==
By early evening, army reinforcements with tanks arrived from Santa Clara, about 30 miles (48 km) to the northeast, while B‑26 and F‑47 aircraft from Camp Columbia began strafing and bombing rebel positions, including the naval headquarters. Some of the aircraft were U.S.‑supplied under the Mutual Defense Assistance Program. The battle continued through the night; by morning, most rebels had either fled into the surrounding hills or died defending their strongholds. Army forces conducted house‑to‑house searches for weapons reportedly distributed to civilians from the arsenal.

Casualty estimates varied widely. Initial reports spoke of about 20 killed and 30 wounded, but later accounts placed the death toll between 75 and 200. Among the dead was Captain Santo Navarro, an aide to the commander of the Cienfuegos naval post, Colonel Roberto Comasanas, who had briefly been taken prisoner by the rebels before leading the government counter‑assault. Three rebel navy officers, thirteen enlisted men, and three maritime police were captured and taken to Havana for interrogation.

== Aftermath ==
In the weeks following the revolt, Batista’s government pursued participants and sympathizers. On 26 September 1957, a secret court‑martial sentenced three navy mutineers to death by firing squad: Lieutenant José Ramón Quesada, Corporal Luis Asea Zequera, and enlisted man Raúl Blentero Arquet Calaña. It was the first time since Cuba’s independence in 1902 that members of the armed forces faced execution for rebellion. Eleven others received thirty‑year prison sentences, one received twenty years, and twelve were sentenced to six years.

== Legacy ==
The Cuban government later memorialized the event as the “Armed Popular Uprising of Cienfuegos.” In a 1977 speech marking the twentieth anniversary, Fidel Castro described it as “an extraordinary moral encouragement” for the guerrillas in the Sierra Maestra, noting that “the tyranny could no longer talk about the unity of its armed forces.” The former San Lorenzo School, one of the battle sites, was renamed the “5 de Septiembre” Basic Secondary School, and annual pilgrimages are made to the Tomás Acea Cemetery, where many of the fallen are buried.
