= Cape Cruz =

Cape in southern Cuba

Cabo Cruz
- Cape
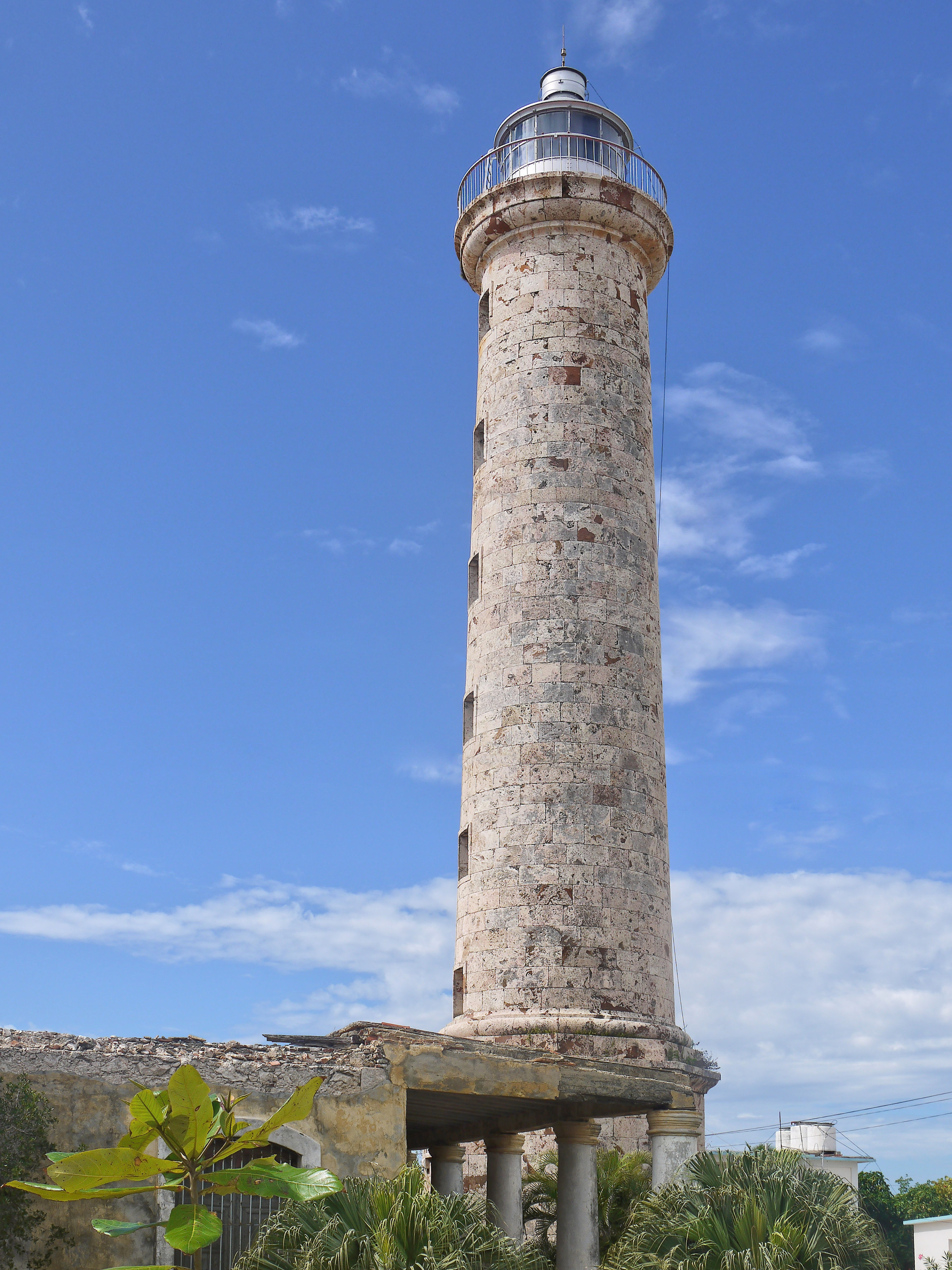

- Location within Cuba
- Coordinates: 19°50′30.58″N 77°43′40.28″W
- Water bodies: Caribbean Sea

Cape Cruz, (Spanish: Cabo Cruz), is a cape that forms the western extremity of the Granma Province in southern Cuba. It extends into the Caribbean Sea and marks the eastern border of the Gulf of Guacanayabo. Cape Cruz is located in the municipality of Niquero and is part of the Desembarco del Granma National Park.

== Architecture ==
The southernmost tip of Cape Cruz is marked by Faro Vargas, a nineteenth-century lighthouse with a height of 32 metres (105 ft).

== Transport ==
The cape is the endpoint of the Niquero branch of the "Circuito Sur de Oriente" (CSO) highway.
