= Santiago de Cuba Uprising =

1956 uprising in Santiago de Cuba

- Part of Cuban Revolution
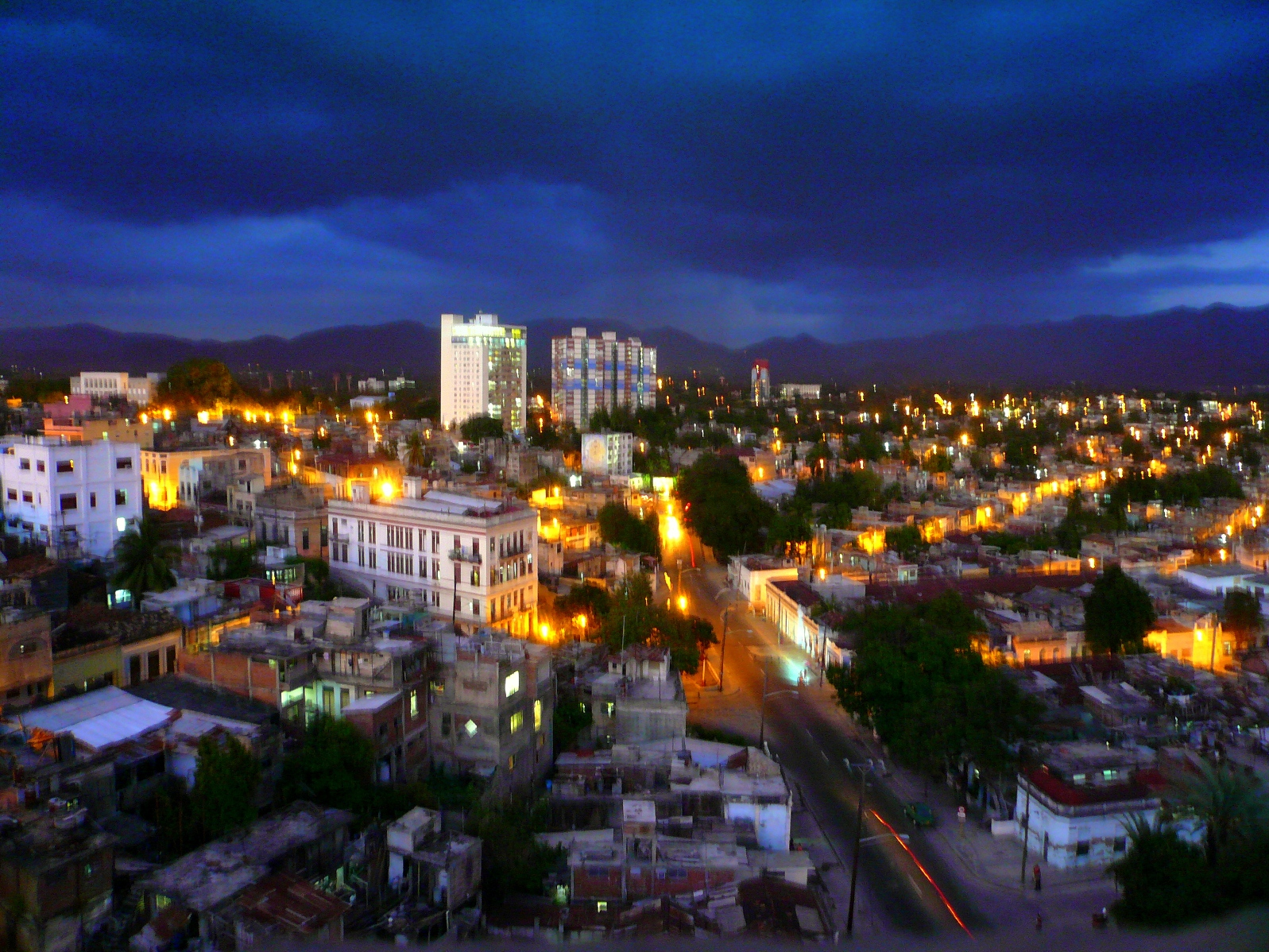
- Santiago de Cuba
Date	30 November 1956
Location	Santiago de Cuba, Santiago Province, Cuba
Result	Cuban victory: Uprising quelled
Territorial changes	Santiago de Cuba occupied by rebels for 2 hours before returning to Cuban military control

Belligerents
Republic of Cuba	26th of July Movement

Commanders and leaders
Fulgencio Batista	Frank País; Celia Sánchez; Haydée Santamaría; Jose "Pepito" Tey †; Otto Parellada †

Units involved
Cuban Police	Unknown

Strength
Unknown	Less than 200

Casualties and losses
Unknown	At least 3 killed

The Santiago de Cuba uprising was an armed uprising organized by the 26th of July Movement on 30 November 1956 in Santiago de Cuba. It was planned by Haydée Santamaría, Celia Sánchez, and Frank País. The rebellion occurred on 30 November and was meant to take place in conjunction with the Landing of the Granma, which was expected to land in Cuba five days after departing from Mexico. A reception party was assigned to wait for the rebels during the uprising at the lighthouse at Cape Cruz with trucks and 100 men. After this, the plan was that they would raid the towns of Niquero and Manzanillo together, after which they would escape into the Sierra Maestra to conduct guerilla warfare. However, due to choppy weather, the Granma had landed two days late on 2 December, and as a result, the supporting uprising was left isolated and was quickly destroyed. As a result of this, the rebels had lost the element of surprise, and the military was put on high alert in the region.

== Background ==
On 5 August 1956, Fidel Castro crossed the Rio Grande. He slipped into the U.S. and went to McAllen, Texas for a pre-arranged meeting with former president Carlos Prío at the hotel "Casa de las Palmas." In McAllen, Castro was given $50,000. He went back to Mexico with Prío’s cash. The plan called for a combined landing at "Playa Colorada," and a large uprising of the Oriente underground. Frank proposed scaling down the operation. He believed that the movement was short on weapons and was not ready for a fight of that magnitude.

An alternative option was for Castro to slip into Oriente with a few men, move undetected into the thick forest cover of the Sierra Maestra, where the underground could reinforce him with men and equipment. Castro insisted on the original plan, however, and prevailed.

The expeditionaries departed from Tuxpan on 25 November 1956 and planned to arrive on 30 November at the coast of Cuba, through Las Coloradas to begin the armed struggle in the Sierra Maestra.

== Uprising ==
Early on 30 November, the rebel groups got their weapons ready, and at 7 a.m. the uprising had started. The main targets were the Police Station located on the Intendente Hill, near the well-known "Calle Padre Pico." Jose "Pepito" Tey and Otto Parellada led this commando assault (they both died in the attack). Jorge Sotús and Roberto Roca led the attack on the other major target at the Naval District headquarters, located by the bay in Michaelsen Avenue.

Taken by surprise, the Moncada Garrison hesitated, and the rebellion spread into the city streets. Dressed in green fatigue uniforms with red and black armbands, the movement took control of the downtown area. Jorge Sotús occupied the maritime building and burned it down. The police station was also burned to the ground. They cut power lines, sabotaged railroad tracks and bridges, but by midafternoon, the army began retaking the city and crushed the uprising. Frank País barely escaped and fled underground.

== Aftermath ==
The boldness of the small band of rebels almost caused the uprising to be a success. The city was controlled by the rebels for about two hours that morning for the simple reason that the troops were garrisoned at the Moncada Barracks when caught off-guard by the rashness of the young rebels. The uprising on 30 November led by a band of young rebels in Santiago de Cuba became major in the struggle to overthrow the dictatorship, finally attained on 1 January 1959.

== See also ==
- Landing of the Granma
- Attack on the Moncada Barracks
