= Guamá, Cuba =

Guamá
- Municipality
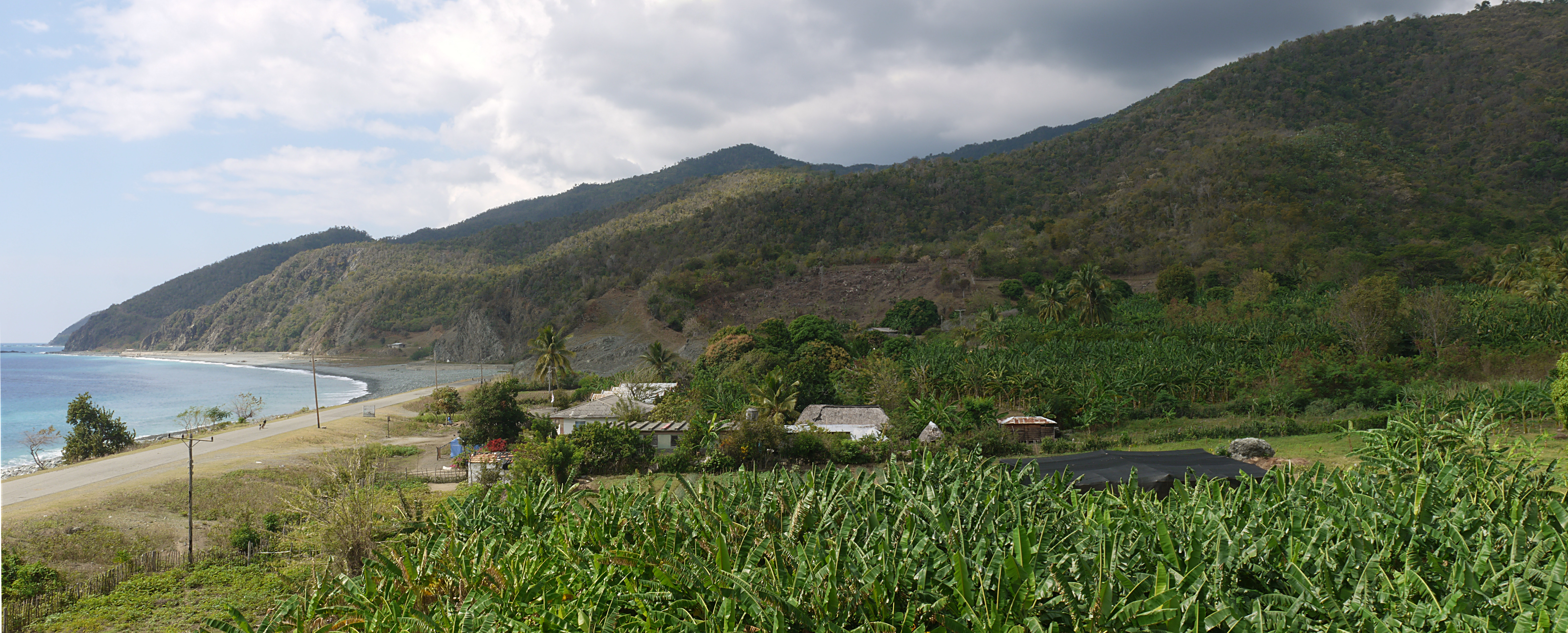

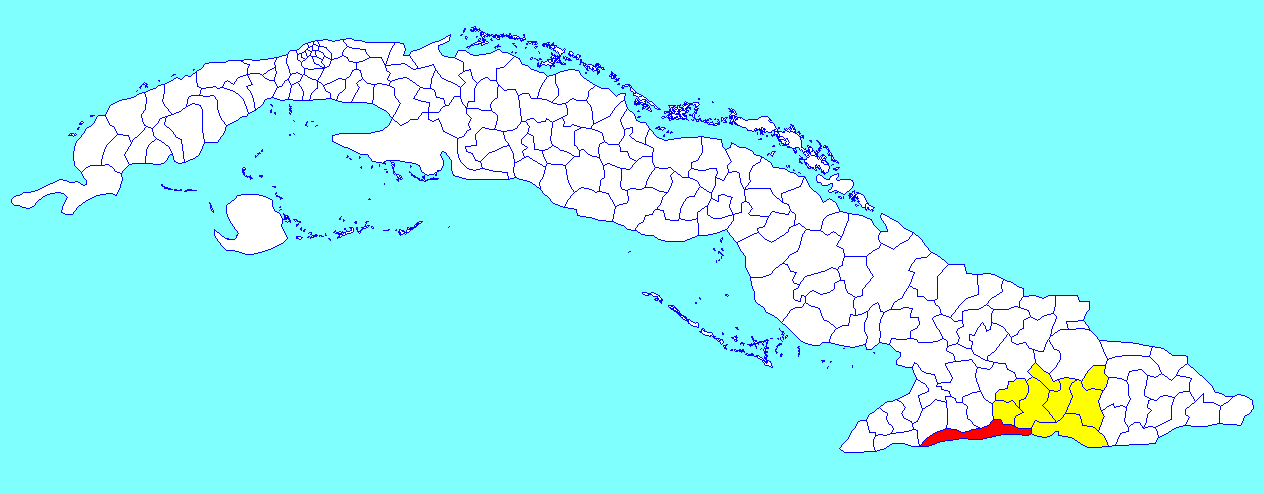
- Guamá municipality (red) within Santiago Province (yellow) and Cuba
- Coordinates: 19°58′33″N 76°24′36″W
- Country: Cuba
- Province: Santiago de Cuba
- Seat: Chivirico

Area
  - Total: 964.6 km^{2} (372.4 sq mi)
- Elevation: 20 m (66 ft)

Population (2022)
  - Total: 34,296
  - Density: 35.55/km^{2} (92.09/sq mi)
- Time zone: UTC-5 (EST)
- Area code: +53-226
- Website: https://www.guama.gob.cu/

Guamá is a municipality in the Santiago de Cuba Province of Cuba. The municipal seat is located in the town of Chivirico. It was named after Guamá, the Taíno cacique who led a rebellion against the Spanish 1530s.

== Geography ==
Guamá is located in the south-west of the province, and contains most of the Caribbean Sea coast west of Santiago de Cuba. It includes the town of Chivirico and the villages of Aserradero, Buey Cabón, Caletón Blanco, Cañizo, Cayo Damas, Dos Ríos, El Francés, El Macho, Guamá Abajo, Juan González, La Magdalena, La Mula, La Plata, La Uvita, Las Cuevas, Ocujal, Quiebra Seca, Río Seco and Uvero.

The Pico Turquino, the highest Cuban peak, is located within the municipality.

== Demographics ==
In 2022, the municipality of Guamá had a population of 34,296. With a total area of 965 km^{2} (373 sq mi), it has a population density of 36.8/km^{2} (95/sq mi).

== Transport ==
The entire municipal coastline is crossed from east to west by the state highway "Circuito Sur de Oriente" (CSO) or Granma Road, which runs along Cuba's southern coast from Santiago de Cuba to the province of Granma.

== See also ==
- List of cities in Cuba
- Municipalities of Cuba
