= Faro Vargas =

Faro Vargas Cabo Cruz
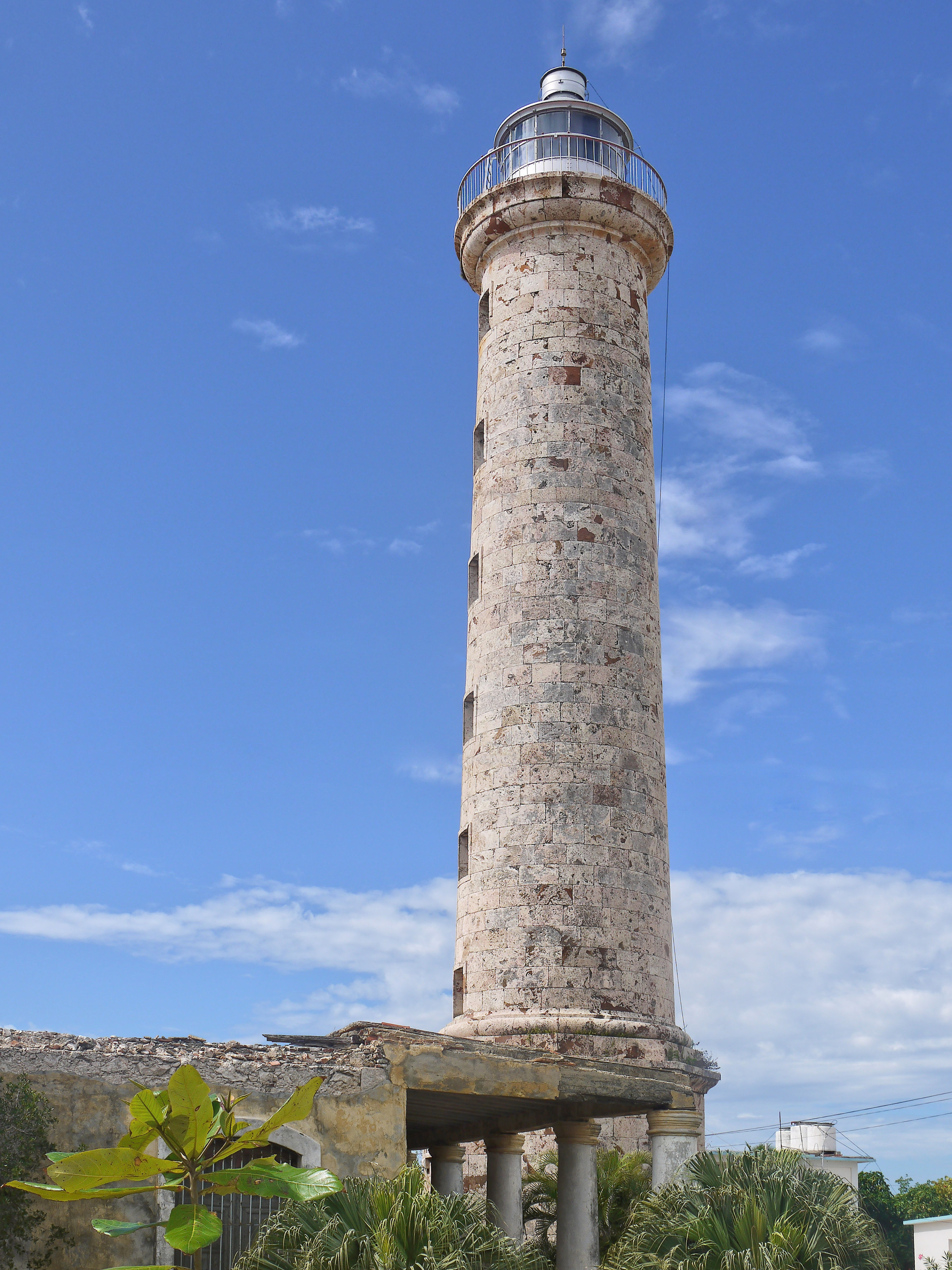
- Location: Cabo Cruz; Granma Province; Cuba
- Coordinates: 19.84111°N 77.726625°W

Tower
- Constructed: 1871
- Construction: stone tower
- Height: 32 metres (105 ft)
- Shape: cylindrical tower with balcony and lantern
- Markings: unpainted stone tower, grey metallic lantern
- Operator: Parque Nacional Desembarco del Granma

Light
- Focal height: 34 metres (112 ft)
- Range: 22 nautical miles (41 km; 25 mi)
- Characteristic: Fl W 5s.
- Cuba no.: CU-0679

The Faro Vargas, also known as Faro de Cabo Cruz, is a staffed lighthouse located on the southernmost part of Cape Cruz in Cuba. Construction of the 32 metre lighthouse started in 1862 and was finished in 1871. The lighthouse has a height of 32 metres (105 ft), a focal height of 34 metres (112 ft) and emits one white flash every 5 seconds (Fl.(1) 5s).

== See also ==
- List of lighthouses in Cuba
