= Cauto Cristo =

- Municipality
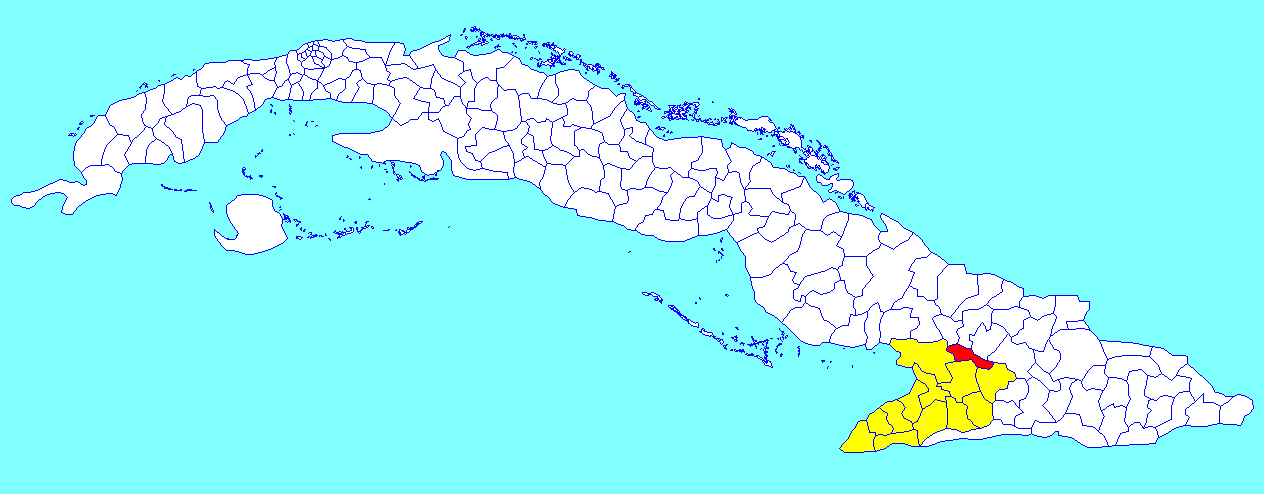
- Cauto Cristo municipality (red) within Granma Province (yellow) and Cuba
- Coordinates: 20°33′43″N 76°28′10″W
- Country: Cuba
- Province: Granma

Area
  - Total: 550 km^{2} (210 sq mi)
- Elevation: 50 m (160 ft)

Population (2022)
  - Total: 20,510
  - Density: 37/km^{2} (97/sq mi)
- Time zone: UTC-5 (EST)
- Area code: +53-23
- Website: https://www.cautocristo.gob.cu/es/

Cauto Cristo is a municipality and town in the Granma Province of Cuba. It is located on the banks of the Río Cauto, in the western part of the province, bordering the provinces of Holguín and Las Tunas.

== Demographics ==
In 2022, the municipality of Cauto Cristo had a population of 20,510. With a total area of 550 km^{2} (210 sq mi), it has a population density of 38.5/km^{2} (100/sq mi).

== See also ==
- Municipalities of Cuba
- List of cities in Cuba
