= Yara, Cuba =

Yara
- Municipality
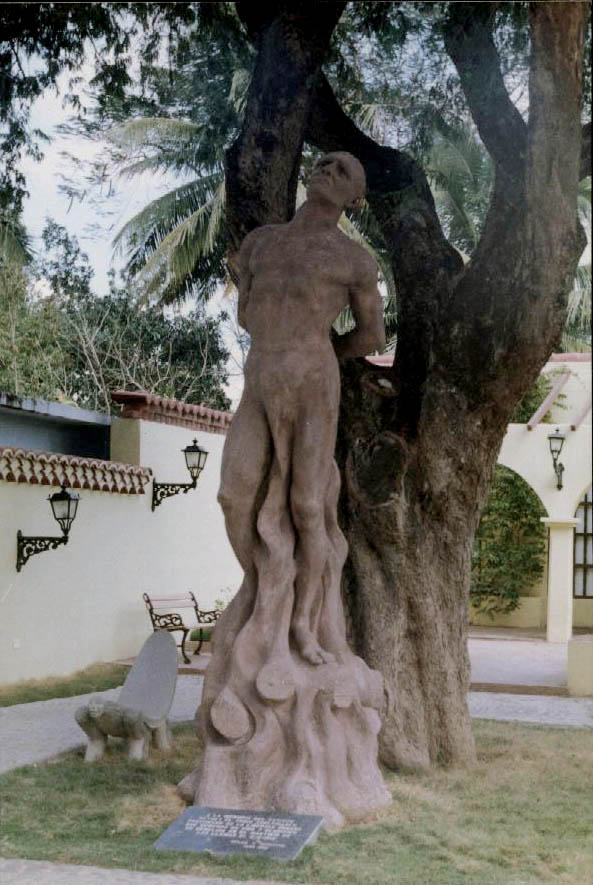
- Monument of Taino chief Hatuey in Yara, depicting the moment he was burnt by Spanish soldiers. Bind to a tamarind tree planted in 1907.

- Flag

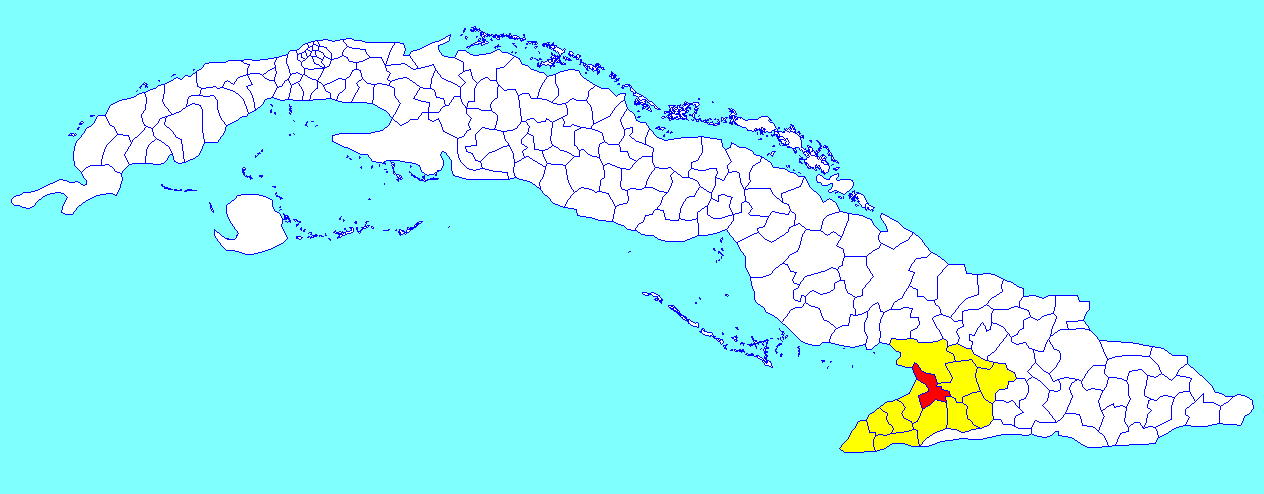
- Yara municipality (red) within Granma Province (yellow) and Cuba
- Coordinates: 20°16′36″N 76°56′49″W
- Country: Cuba
- Province: Granma
- Established: 1912

Area
  - Total: 576 km^{2} (222 sq mi)
- Elevation: 30 m (98 ft)

Population (2022)
  - Total: 53,818
  - Density: 93.4/km^{2} (242/sq mi)
- Time zone: UTC-5 (EST)
- Area code: +53-23
- Website: https://www.yara.gob.cu/

Yara is a small town and municipality in the Granma Province of Cuba, located halfway between the cities of Bayamo and Manzanillo, in the Gulf of Guacanayabo. Yara means "place" in the Taíno language.

== History ==
The Taíno Cacique (chief) Hatuey was burnt at the stake in Yara, on February 2, 1512, after he organized a guerrilla war against the Spaniards. Hatuey is known as "Cuba's First National Hero". This action gave birth to one of Cuba's major myths; "La Luz de Yara", The Light of Yara.

On October 10, 1868, the beginning of the Ten Years' War in Cuba occurred and is known as El Grito de Yara (The Cry of Yara) and was the beginning of the First Cuban War of Independence.

Yara was established as a municipality in 1912, when Manzanillo was split up.

== Geography ==
The municipality is divided into the barrios of Yara, Yara Arriba, Veguitas, Buey de Gallego, Coco, Caboa, Cabagán, Calambrosio, Canabacoa, Cayo Redondo, José Martí, Los Cayos, Mateo Romás and Sofía.

== Demographics ==
In 2022, the municipality of Yara had a population of 53,818. With a total area of 576 km^{2} (222 sq mi), it has a population density of 93/km^{2} (240/sq mi).

== Personalities ==
- Bartolomé Masó (1830–1907), soldier and politician
- Tete Puebla (born 1940), Cuban politician
- Harry Villegas (1940–2019), Cuban revolutionary
- Huber Matos (1918–2014), Cuban revolutionary military leader, political dissident against Castro's marxist regime, political prisoner, activist and writer

== See also ==
- Circuito Sur de Oriente
- Municipalities of Cuba
- List of cities in Cuba
