= Municipalities of Cuba =

Municipalities of Cuba

The provinces of Cuba are divided into 168 municipalities (Spanish: municipios). They were defined by Cuban Law Number 1304 of July 3, 1976 and reformed in 2010 with the abrogation of the municipality of Varadero and the creation of two new provinces: Artemisa and Mayabeque in place of former La Habana Province.

== Summary ==
The municipalities are listed below, by province:

Province	Municipalities
Artemisa Province	
Camagüey Province	
Ciego de Ávila Province	
Cienfuegos Province	
Granma Province	
Guantánamo Province	
Havana	Arroyo Naranjo; Boyeros; Centro Habana; Cerro; Cotorro; Diez de Octubre; Guanabacoa; La Habana del Este; La Habana Vieja; La Lisa; Marianao; Playa; Plaza de la Revolución; Regla; San Miguel del Padrón
Holguín Province	
Isla de la Juventud	Isla de la Juventud (seat: Nueva Gerona)
Las Tunas Province	
Matanzas Province	
Mayabeque Province	
Pinar del Río Province	
Sancti Spíritus Province	
Santiago de Cuba Province	
Villa Clara Province	

== List of municipalities ==
Province	Municipality	Population (2019)	Population (2004)	Area (km^{2})	Location	Remarks
Artemisa	Alquizar	33,467	29,616	194	22.80667°N 82.58278°W	
Artemisa	Artemisa	86,161	81,209	689	22.81361°N 82.76333°W	Provincial capital
Artemisa	Bahía Honda	43,024	45,968	784	22.90639°N 83.16361°W	Transferred from Pinar del Río Province in 2011
Artemisa	Bauta	51,135	45,509	156	22.99194°N 82.54917°W	
Artemisa	Caimito	42,346	36,813	240	22.95778°N 82.59639°W	
Artemisa	Candelaria	21,201	19,523	299	22.74444°N 82.96583°W	Transferred from Pinar del Río Province in 2011
Artemisa	Guanajay	28,156	28,429	110	22.93056°N 82.68778°W	
Artemisa	Güira de Melena	40,142	37,838	177	22.80222°N 82.50472°W	
Artemisa	Mariel	44,956	42,504	271	22.99389°N 82.75389°W	
Artemisa	San Antonio de los Baños	50,827	46,300	126	22.88889°N 82.49861°W	
Artemisa	San Cristóbal	71,726	70,830	936	22.71694°N 83.05111°W	Transferred from Pinar del Río Province in 2011
Camagüey	Camagüey	332,427	324,921	1,093	21.38389°N 77.90722°W	Provincial capital, World Heritage Site
Camagüey	Carlos Manuel de Céspedes	23,302	25,707	664	21.57694°N 78.27750°W	
Camagüey	Esmeralda	29,616	29,953	1,224	21.85611°N 78.11111°W	
Camagüey	Florida	70,380	73,612	1,744	21.52944°N 78.22250°W	
Camagüey	Guáimaro	36,963	57,086	1,849	21.05889°N 77.34778°W	
Camagüey	Jimaguayú	20,046	21,169	793	21.26667°N 77.83028°W	
Camagüey	Minas	36,680	38,517	1,005	21.48944°N 77.60472°W	
Camagüey	Najasa	15,002	16,470	901	21.08389°N 77.74694°W	
Camagüey	Nuevitas	60,785	44,882	1,778	21.54028°N 77.26444°W	
Camagüey	Santa Cruz del Sur	41,857	51,335	1,234	20.71944°N 77.99083°W	
Camagüey	Sibanicú	29,693	31,117	745	21.23917°N 77.52083°W	
Camagüey	Sierra de Cubitas	18,042	18,589	560	21.73306°N 77.77056°W	Most populated town: Sola
Camagüey	Vertientes	50,001	53,299	2,024	21.25722°N 78.14889°W	
Ciego de Ávila	Baraguá	32,185	32,408	737	21.68222°N 78.62444°W	Seat: Gaspar
Ciego de Ávila	Bolivia	15,301	16,612	894	22.07500°N 78.35028°W	
Ciego de Ávila	Chambas	37,099	39,868	1,177	22.19667°N 78.91306°W	
Ciego de Ávila	Ciego de Ávila	156,571	135,736	436	21.84806°N 78.76278°W	Provincial capital
Ciego de Ávila	Ciro Redondo	30,631	29,560	576	22.01889°N 78.70278°W	
Ciego de Ávila	Florencia	18,793	19,811	284	22.14750°N 78.96694°W	
Ciego de Ávila	Majagua	25,415	26,617	542	21.92444°N 78.99056°W	
Ciego de Ávila	Morón	70,595	60,612	586	22.11083°N 78.62778°W	
Ciego de Ávila	Primero de Enero	22,825	27,813	717	21.94528°N 78.41889°W	Former name: Violeta
Ciego de Ávila	Venezuela	26,173	27,333	836	21.75111°N 78.77889°W	
Cienfuegos	Abreus	30,719	30,330	561	22.28056°N 80.56778°W	
Cienfuegos	Aguada de Pasajeros	31,843	31,687	680	22.38472°N 80.84611°W	
Cienfuegos	Cienfuegos	177,958	163,824	341	22.14583°N 80.43639°W	Provincial capital, World Heritage Site
Cienfuegos	Cruces	29,790	32,139	198	22.34222°N 80.27611°W	
Cienfuegos	Cumanayagua	48,301	51,435	1,102	22.15250°N 80.20111°W	
Cienfuegos	Lajas	21,669	22,602	432	22.41639°N 80.29056°W	
Cienfuegos	Palmira	32,514	33,153	318	22.24444°N 80.39417°W	
Cienfuegos	Rodas	33,511	33,477	549	22.34278°N 80.55528°W	
Granma	Bartolomé Masó	47,828	53,024	635	20.16861°N 76.94250°W	
Granma	Bayamo	239,225	222,118	918	20.38167°N 76.64250°W	Provincial capital
Granma	Buey Arriba	31,181	31,327	454	20.17361°N 76.74917°W	
Granma	Campechuela	42,919	46,092	579	20.23333°N 77.27889°W	
Granma	Cauto Cristo	20,574	21,159	552	20.56222°N 76.46944°W	
Granma	Guisa	45,882	50,923	596	20.26111°N 76.53806°W	
Granma	Jiguaní	59,848	60,320	646	20.37333°N 76.42222°W	
Granma	Manzanillo	127,167	130,789	500	20.33972°N 77.10861°W	
Granma	Media Luna	32,319	35,330	371	20.14444°N 77.43611°W	
Granma	Niquero	41,993	41,252	588	20.04722°N 77.57806°W	
Granma	Pilón	29,248	29,751	460	19.90556°N 77.32083°W	
Granma	Río Cauto	46,378	47,833	1,505	20.56389°N 76.91722°W	
Granma	Yara	55,180	59,415	571	20.27694°N 76.94694°W	
Guantánamo	Baracoa	79,270	81,794	974	20.35056°N 74.51028°W	
Guantánamo	Caimanera	11,269	10,562	361	19.99500°N 75.15972°W	
Guantánamo	El Salvador	42,120	45,662	634	20.20972°N 75.22278°W	
Guantánamo	Guantánamo	225,699	244,603	737	20.13694°N 75.21389°W	Provincial capital
Guantánamo	Imías	20,903	20,959	527	20.07694°N 74.65167°W	
Guantánamo	Maisí	28,724	28,276	523	20.24333°N 74.15583°W	Seat: La Máquina
Guantánamo	Manuel Tames	36,900	14,200	527	20.18056°N 75.05139°W	Seat: Jamaica
Guantánamo	Niceto Pérez	16,320	17,783	637	20.12778°N 75.34194°W	
Guantánamo	San Antonio del Sur	25,719	26,509	585	20.05694°N 74.80778°W	
Guantánamo	Yateras	18,930	20,358	663	20.35028°N 74.92417°W	Seat: Palenque
Havana	Arroyo Naranjo	205,701	210,053	82	23.04361°N 82.33278°W	
Havana	Boyeros	199,633	188,593	130	23.00722°N 82.40167°W	
Havana	Centro Habana	133,898	158,151	3	23.13333°N 82.38333°W	
Havana	Cerro	124,646	132,351	10	23.11361°N 82.36333°W	
Havana	Cotorro	82,049	74,650	66	23.02611°N 82.24750°W	
Havana	Diez de Octubre	201,435	227,293	12	23.08806°N 82.35972°W	
Havana	Guanabacoa	125,702	112,964	129	23.06111°N 82.28972°W	
Havana	Habana del Este	174,807	178,041	141	23.15694°N 82.29694°W	
Havana	Old Havana	81,313	95,383	4	23.13889°N 82.35556°W	World Heritage Site
Havana	La Lisa	145,023	131,148	37	23.02472°N 82.46306°W	
Havana	Marianao	134,994	135,551	22	23.08417°N 82.42972°W	
Havana	Playa	178,557	186,959	35	23.09417°N 82.44889°W	
Havana	Plaza de la Revolución	141,781	161,631	12	23.12444°N 82.38611°W	Government district
Havana	Regla	43,833	44,431	10	23.12556°N 82.31528°W	
Havana	San Miguel del Padrón	159,022	159,273	26	23.09639°N 82.32667°W	
Holguín	Antilla	12,539	12,222	101	20.84861°N 75.75250°W	
Holguín	Báguanos	49,024	52,854	806	20.76306°N 76.02944°W	
Holguín	Banes	77,317	81,274	781	20.97000°N 75.71139°W	
Holguín	Cacocum	39,990	42,623	660	20.74389°N 76.32417°W	
Holguín	Calixto García	54,450	57,867	617	20.85417°N 76.60194°W	Seat: Buenaventura
Holguín	Cueto	31,367	34,503	324	20.64833°N 75.93167°W	
Holguín	Frank País	22,896	25,621	512	20.66472°N 75.28139°W	Seat: Cayo Mambí
Holguín	Gibara	70,965	72,810	626	21.10722°N 76.13667°W	
Holguín	Holguín	356,942	326,740	658	20.88889°N 76.25722°W	Provincial capital
Holguín	Mayarí	96,248	105,505	1,311	20.65944°N 75.67778°W	
Holguín	Moa	73,093	71,079	732	20.64000°N 74.91750°W	
Holguín	Rafael Freyre	53,770	50,080	618	21.02833°N 75.99639°W	Seat: Santa Lucía
Holguín	Sagua de Tánamo	46,144	52,013	702	20.58611°N 75.24167°W	
Holguín	Urbano Noris	38,958	43,892	845	20.60139°N 76.13250°W	Seat: San Germán
Isla de la Juventud	Isla de la Juventud	83,544	86,420	2,419	21.88472°N 82.86583°W	Special municipality, seat: Nueva Gerona
Las Tunas	Amancio	37,308	41,523	853	20.81972°N 77.58417°W	
Las Tunas	Colombia	31,999	32,942	560	20.99083°N 77.41583°W	
Las Tunas	Jesús Menéndez	47,907	51,002	637	21.16361°N 76.47722°W	
Las Tunas	Jobabo	42,008	49,403	886	20.90806°N 77.28306°W	
Las Tunas	Las Tunas	212,732	187,438	895	20.96000°N 76.95444°W	Provincial capital
Las Tunas	Majibacoa	41,118	40,264	622	20.91722°N 76.87611°W	Seat: Calixto
Las Tunas	Manatí	29,653	33,573	954	21.31472°N 76.93750°W	
Las Tunas	Puerto Padre	91,459	93,705	1,180	21.19528°N 76.60139°W	
Matanzas	Calimete	27,880	29,736	958	22.53389°N 80.90972°W	
Matanzas	Cárdenas	158,112	103,087	614	23.04278°N 81.20361°W	Varadero merged into Cárdenas in 2011
Matanzas	Cienaga de Zapata	10,319	8,750	4,162	22.28806°N 81.19750°W	Seat: Playa Larga
Matanzas	Colón	69,277	71,579	597	22.72250°N 80.90639°W	
Matanzas	Jagüey Grande	60,438	57,771	882	22.52944°N 81.13250°W	
Matanzas	Jovellanos	58,031	58,685	504	22.81056°N 81.19778°W	
Matanzas	Limonar	26,778	25,421	449	22.95611°N 81.40861°W	
Matanzas	Los Arabos	23,801	25,702	760	22.74000°N 80.71583°W	
Matanzas	Martí	21,933	23,475	1,029	22.95250°N 80.91667°W	
Matanzas	Matanzas	163,568	143,706	315	23.05139°N 81.57500°W	Provincial capital
Matanzas	Pedro Betancourt	30,363	32,218	387	22.73056°N 81.29083°W	
Matanzas	Perico	30,414	31,147	279	22.77528°N 81.01500°W	
Matanzas	Unión de Reyes	35,846	40,022	866	22.80056°N 81.53694°W	
Mayabeque	Batabanó	27,431	25,664	228	22.72472°N 82.28972°W	
Mayabeque	Bejucal	28,160	25,425	121	22.93278°N 82.38694°W	
Mayabeque	Güines	66,031	68,951	437	22.84778°N 82.02361°W	
Mayabeque	Jaruco	24,491	25,658	276	23.04278°N 82.00917°W	
Mayabeque	Madruga	27,213	30,640	463	22.91639°N 81.85694°W	
Mayabeque	Melena del Sur	20,445	20,445	228	22.78167°N 82.14833°W	
Mayabeque	Nueva Paz	23,832	24,277	513	22.76333°N 81.75806°W	
Mayabeque	Quivicán	30,059	29,253	285	22.82472°N 82.35583°W	
Mayabeque	San José de las Lajas	80,305	69,375	597	22.96806°N 82.15583°W	Provincial capital
Mayabeque	San Nicolás	20,723	21,563	241	22.78194°N 81.90667°W	
Mayabeque	Santa Cruz del Norte	35,179	32,576	379	23.15583°N 81.92639°W	
Pinar del Río	Consolación del Sur	88,415	87,500	1,112	22.50000°N 83.51528°W	
Pinar del Río	Guane	35,659	35,893	717	22.20056°N 84.08361°W	
Pinar del Río	La Palma	33,915	35,426	621	22.75611°N 83.55333°W	
Pinar del Río	Los Palacios	38,351	38,950	786	22.58250°N 83.24889°W	
Pinar del Río	Mantua	23,706	26,065	915	22.29083°N 84.28722°W	
Pinar del Río	Minas de Matahambre	31,609	34,419	858	22.58250°N 83.94917°W	
Pinar del Río	Pinar del Río	192,776	190,532	708	22.42583°N 83.68833°W	Provincial capital
Pinar del Río	San Juan y Martínez	43,074	45,061	409	22.26667°N 83.83389°W	
Pinar del Río	San Luis	31,741	34,085	773	22.28306°N 83.76778°W	
Pinar del Río	Sandino	36,105	39,245	1,718	22.08111°N 84.22167°W	
Pinar del Río	Viñales	29,028	27,129	704	22.61528°N 83.71583°W	World Heritage Site
Sancti Spíritus	Cabaiguán	64,925	67,224	596	22.08389°N 79.49528°W	
Sancti Spíritus	Fomento	31,975	33,528	475	22.10528°N 79.72000°W	
Sancti Spíritus	Jatibonico	42,764	42,708	763	21.94639°N 79.16750°W	
Sancti Spíritus	La Sierpe	16,644	16,937	1,035	21.76083°N 79.24333°W	
Sancti Spíritus	Sancti Spíritus	143,252	133,843	1,151	21.93417°N 79.44361°W	Provincial capital
Sancti Spíritus	Taguasco	33,542	36,365	515	22.00528°N 79.26500°W	
Sancti Spíritus	Trinidad	77,185	73,466	1,159	21.80444°N 79.98278°W	World Heritage Site
Sancti Spíritus	Yaguajay	54,791	58,938	1,042	22.33056°N 79.23694°W	
Santiago de Cuba	Contramaestre	105,370	101,832	611	20.30000°N 76.25056°W	
Santiago de Cuba	Guama	34,206	35,516	950	19.95361°N 76.74944°W	
Santiago de Cuba	Mella	34,614	33,667	323	20.36944°N 75.91083°W	
Santiago de Cuba	Palma Soriano	121,943	124,585	851	20.21417°N 75.99167°W	
Santiago de Cuba	San Luis	78,702	88,496	337	20.18806°N 75.84861°W	
Santiago de Cuba	Santiago de Cuba	509,841	472,255	1,026	20.04028°N 75.81472°W	Provincial capital, World Heritage Site
Santiago de Cuba	Segundo Frente	40,413	40,885	536	20.41194°N 75.52861°W	Seat: Mayarí Arriba
Santiago de Cuba	Songo – La Maya	91,143	100,287	720	20.17333°N 75.64611°W	Seat: La Maya
Santiago de Cuba	Tercer Frente	30,403	30,457	366	20.17194°N 76.32722°W	Seat: Cruce de los Baños
Villa Clara	Caibarién	40,616	38,064	426	22.51583°N 79.47222°W	
Villa Clara	Camajuaní	58,736	63,544	613	22.46806°N 79.72361°W	
Villa Clara	Cifuentes	26,851	33,391	513	22.62083°N 80.06583°W	
Villa Clara	Corralillo	25,336	27,571	837	22.98583°N 80.58278°W	
Villa Clara	Encrucijada	32,397	33,641	563	22.61722°N 79.86611°W	
Villa Clara	Manicaragua	63,190	73,370	1,064	22.15028°N 79.97611°W	
Villa Clara	Placetas	67,005	71,837	601	22.31611°N 79.65528°W	
Villa Clara	Quemado de Güines	21,000	22,590	340	22.79000°N 80.25583°W	
Villa Clara	Ranchuelo	52,417	59,062	554	22.33611°N 80.11278°W	
Villa Clara	Remedios	43,570	46,482	559	22.49222°N 79.54556°W	
Villa Clara	Sagua la Grande	51,088	56,097	945	22.80889°N 80.07083°W	
Villa Clara	Santa Clara	246,871	237,581	518	22.40556°N 79.95389°W	Provincial capital
Villa Clara	Santo Domingo	48,423	53,840	881	22.58361°N 80.23833°W	

== Municipal maps ==
The maps below show the municipal subdivision of each province, in yellow, within Cuba. Each provincial capital is shown in red.^{1}

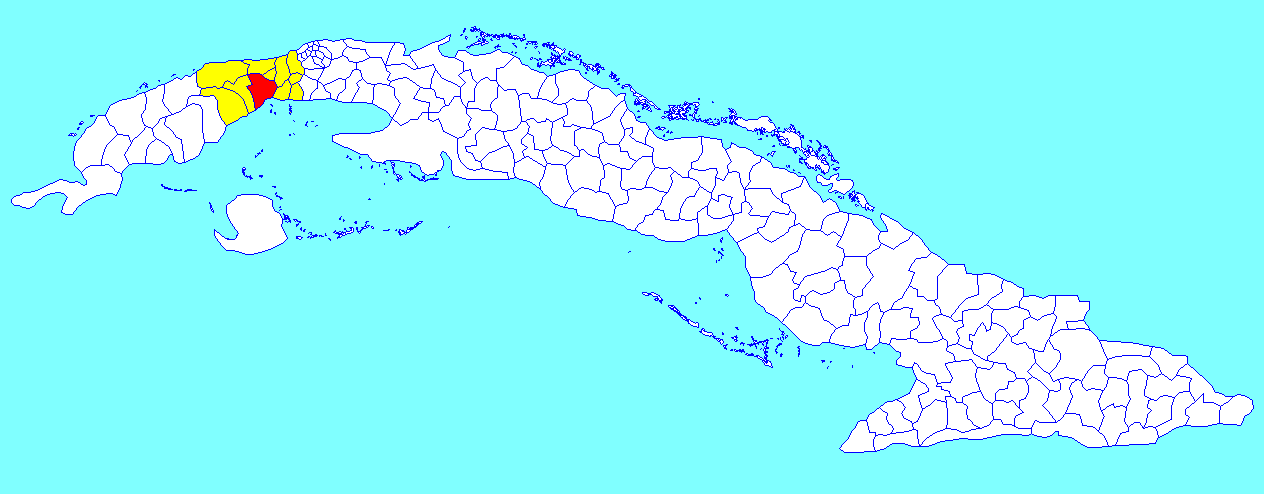
Artemisa

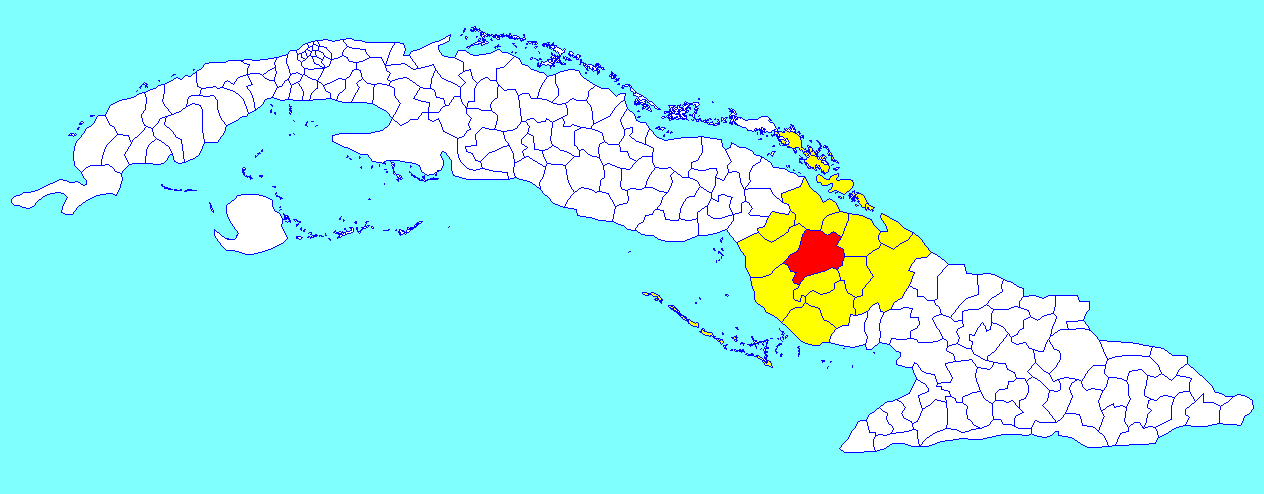
Camagüey

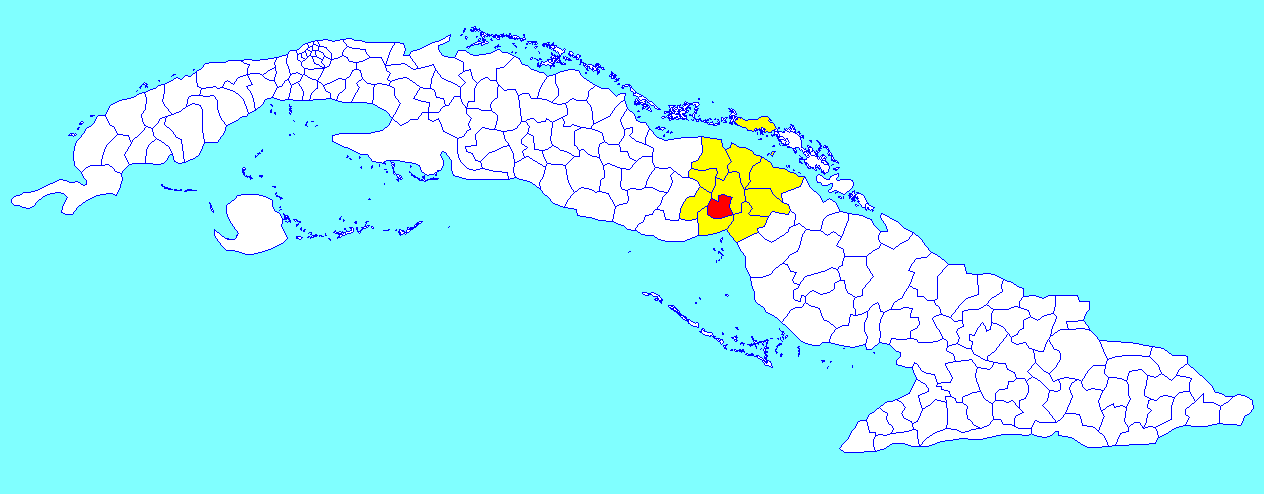
Ciego de Ávila

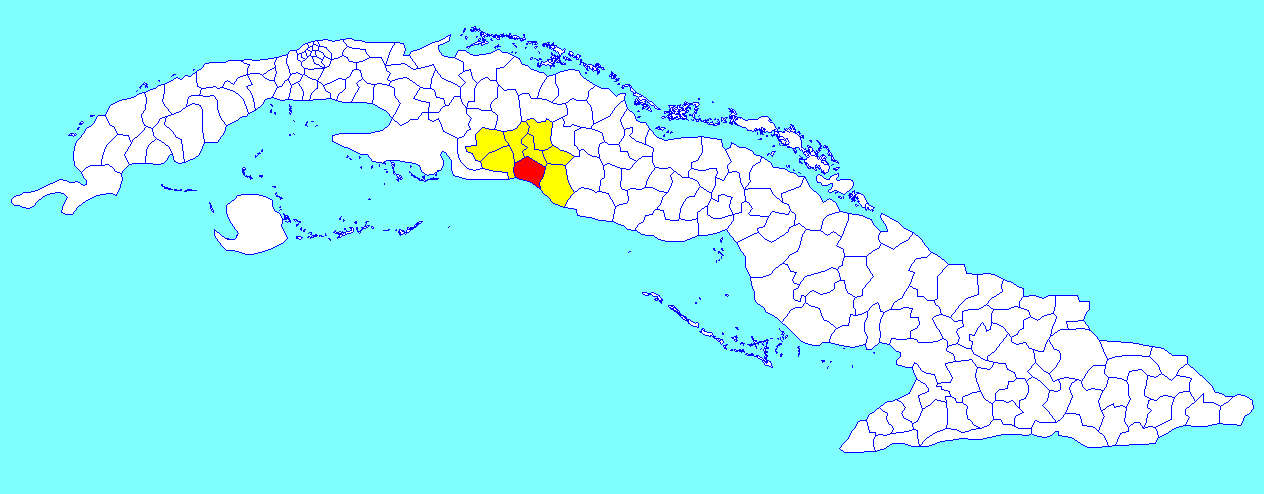
Cienfuegos
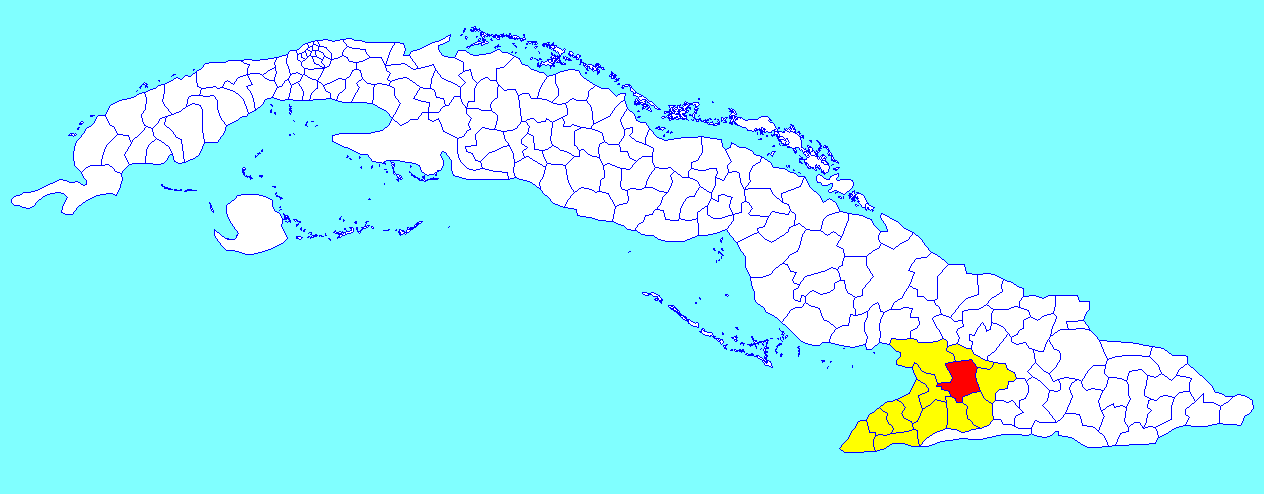
Granma

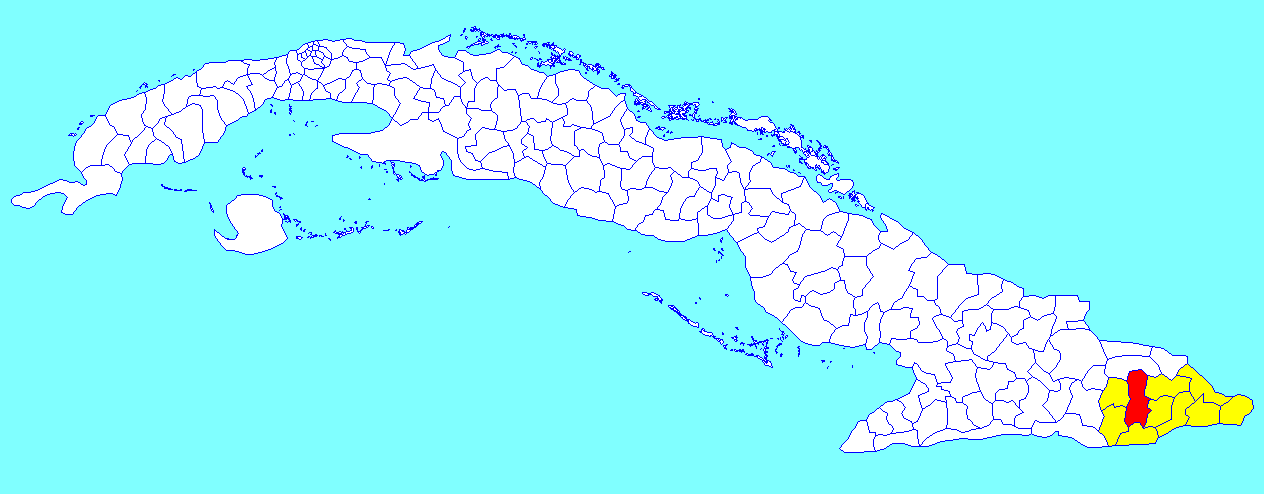
Guantánamo

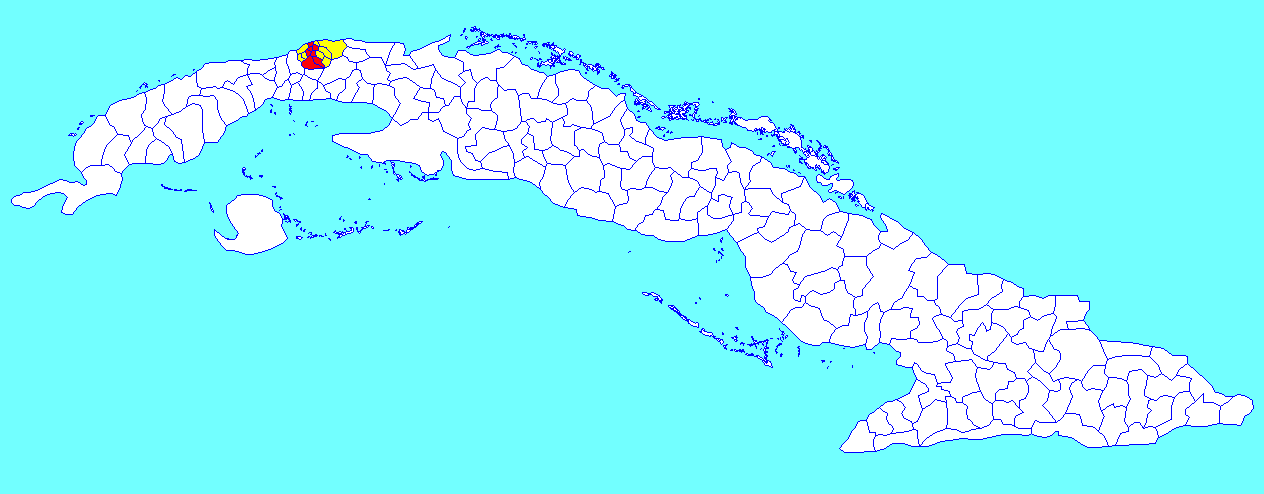
Havana

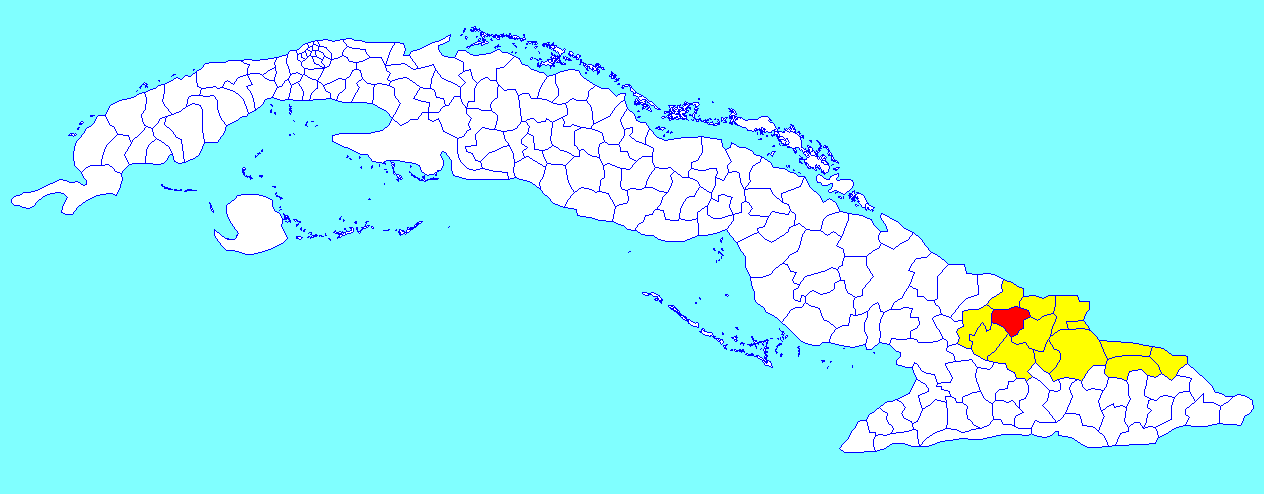
Holguín
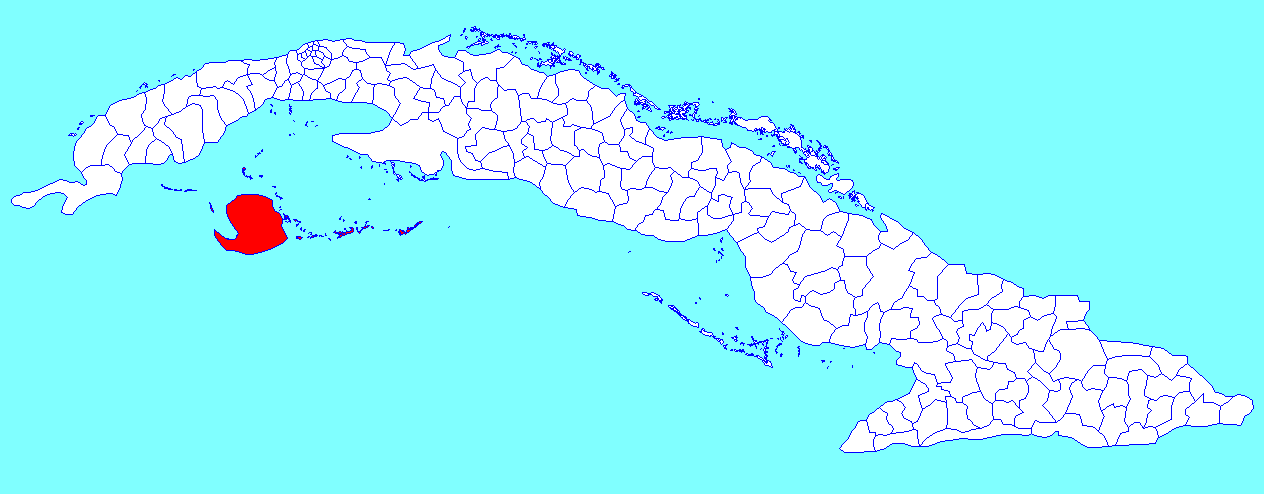
Isla de la Juventud

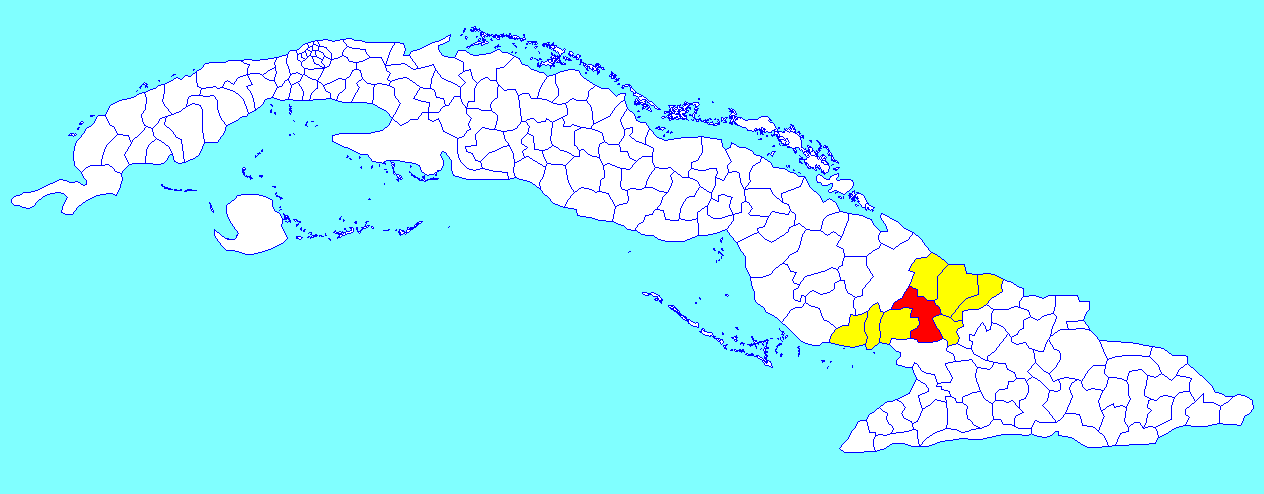
Las Tunas

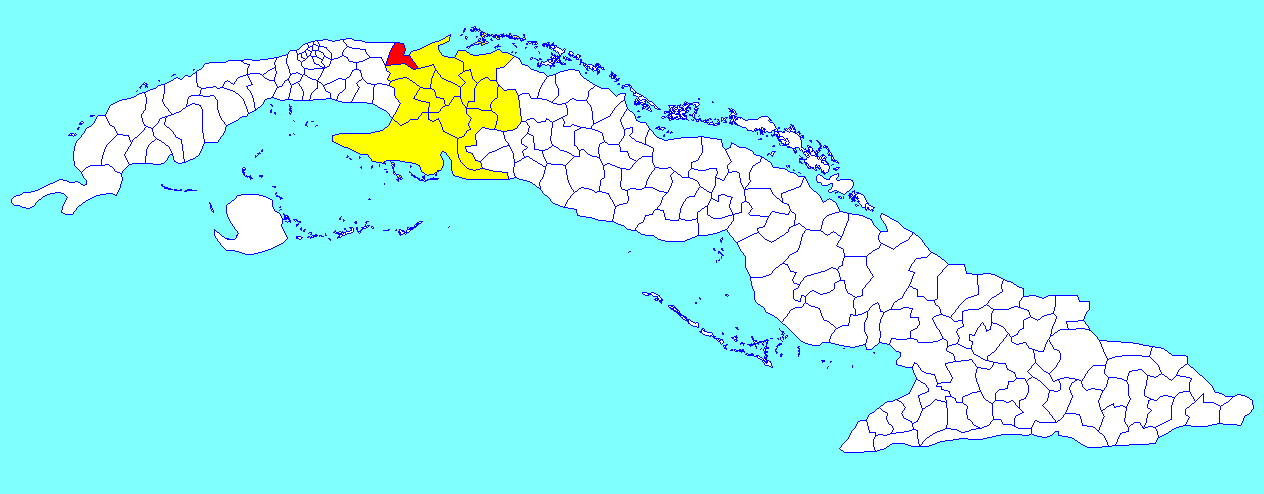
Matanzas

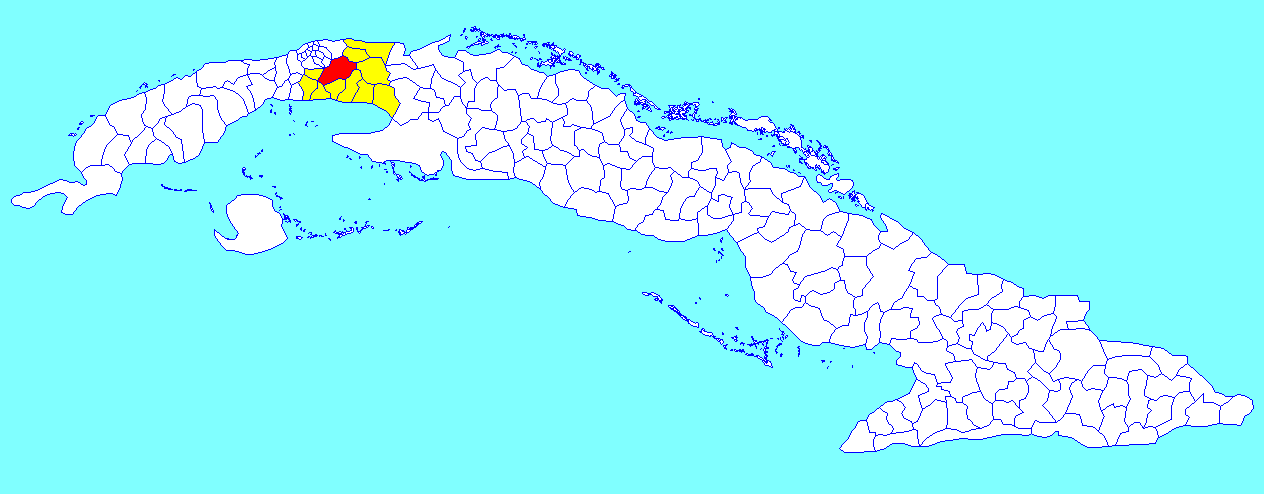
Mayabeque
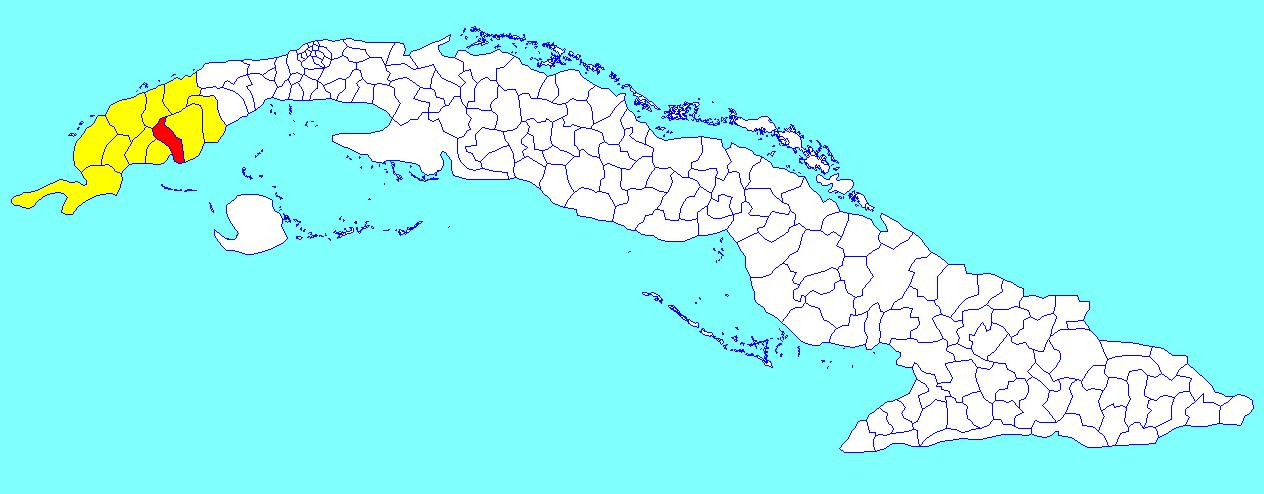
Pinar del Río

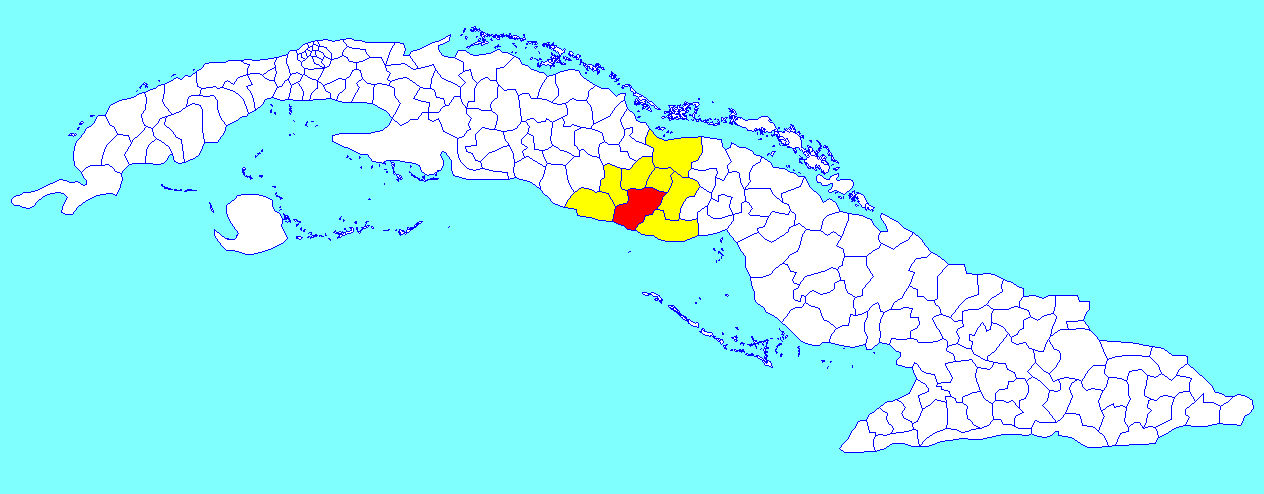
Sancti Spíritus

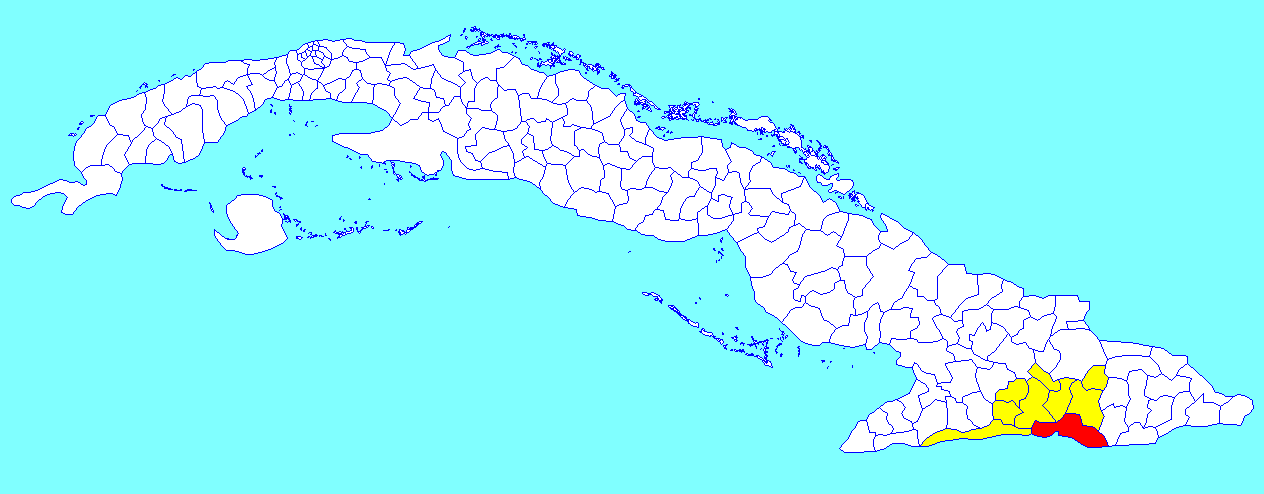
Santiago de Cuba

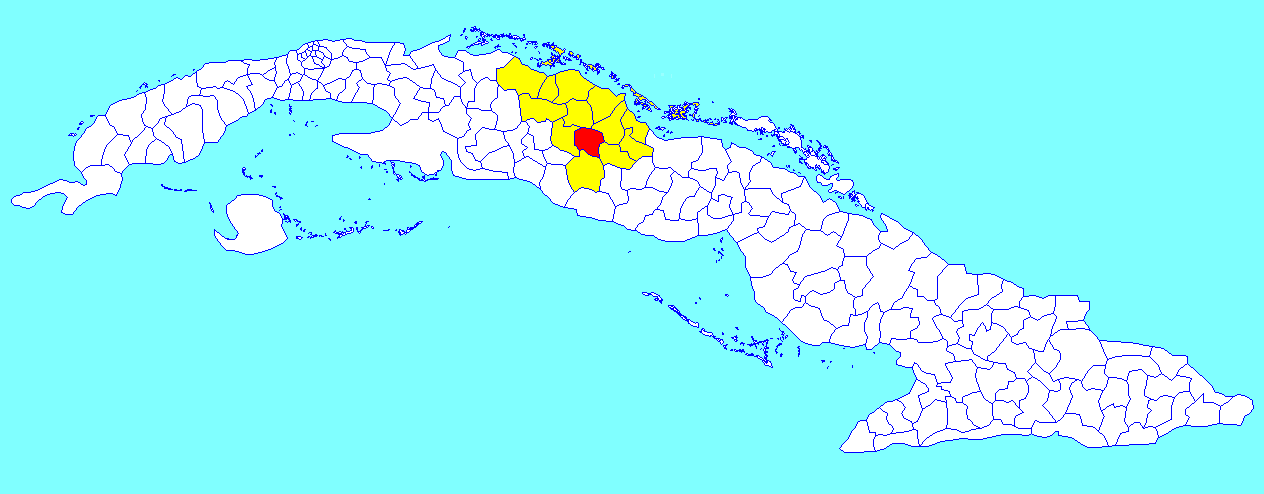
Villa Clara

Note:

^1 – Exceptions related to the provinces shown only in red: Havana is a city-province, and shows also its 15 municipal boroughs. Isla de la Juventud is a special (and single) municipality having provincial level.

== See also ==
- Provinces of Cuba
- List of cities in Cuba
- List of places in Cuba
