= Campechuela =

- Municipality
- Coat of arms

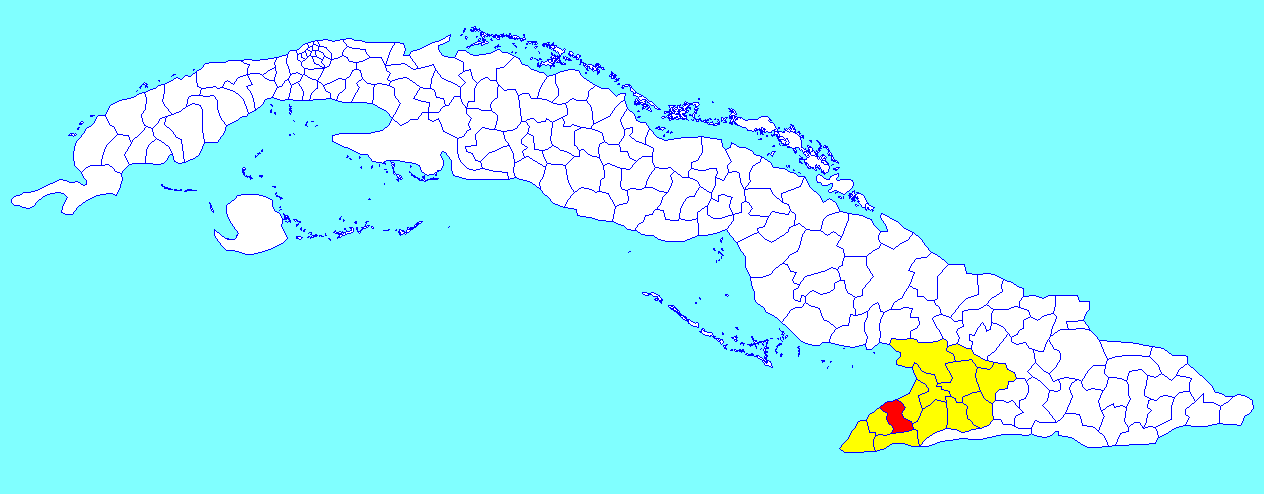
- Campechuela municipality (red) within Granma Province (yellow) and Cuba
- Coordinates: 20°14′0″N 77°16′45″W
- Country: Cuba
- Province: Granma
- Established: 1869

Area
  - Total: 577 km^{2} (223 sq mi)
- Elevation: 10 m (33 ft)

Population (2022)
  - Total: 41,719
  - Density: 72.3/km^{2} (187/sq mi)
- Time zone: UTC-5 (EST)
- Area code: +53-23
- Website: https://www.campechuela.gob.cu/es/

Campechuela is a municipality and town in Granma Province of Cuba. It is located on the southern shore of the Gulf of Guacanayabo.

== History ==
The town of Campechuela was founded in 1869. It became the seat of the municipality in 1912.

== Geography ==
The municipality is divided into the barrios of Cabecera (Campechuela town), Ceiba Hueca, Cienaguilla, La Gloria, San Ramón and Tana.

== Demographics ==
In 2022, the municipality of Campechuela had a population of 41,719. With a total area of 577 km^{2} (223 sq mi), it has a population density of 72/km^{2} (190/sq mi).

== Economy ==
The economy is based on agriculture (with sugarcane and fruit farms) and stock raising.

== See also ==
- Circuito Sur de Oriente
- Municipalities of Cuba
- List of cities in Cuba
