= Niquero =

- Municipality
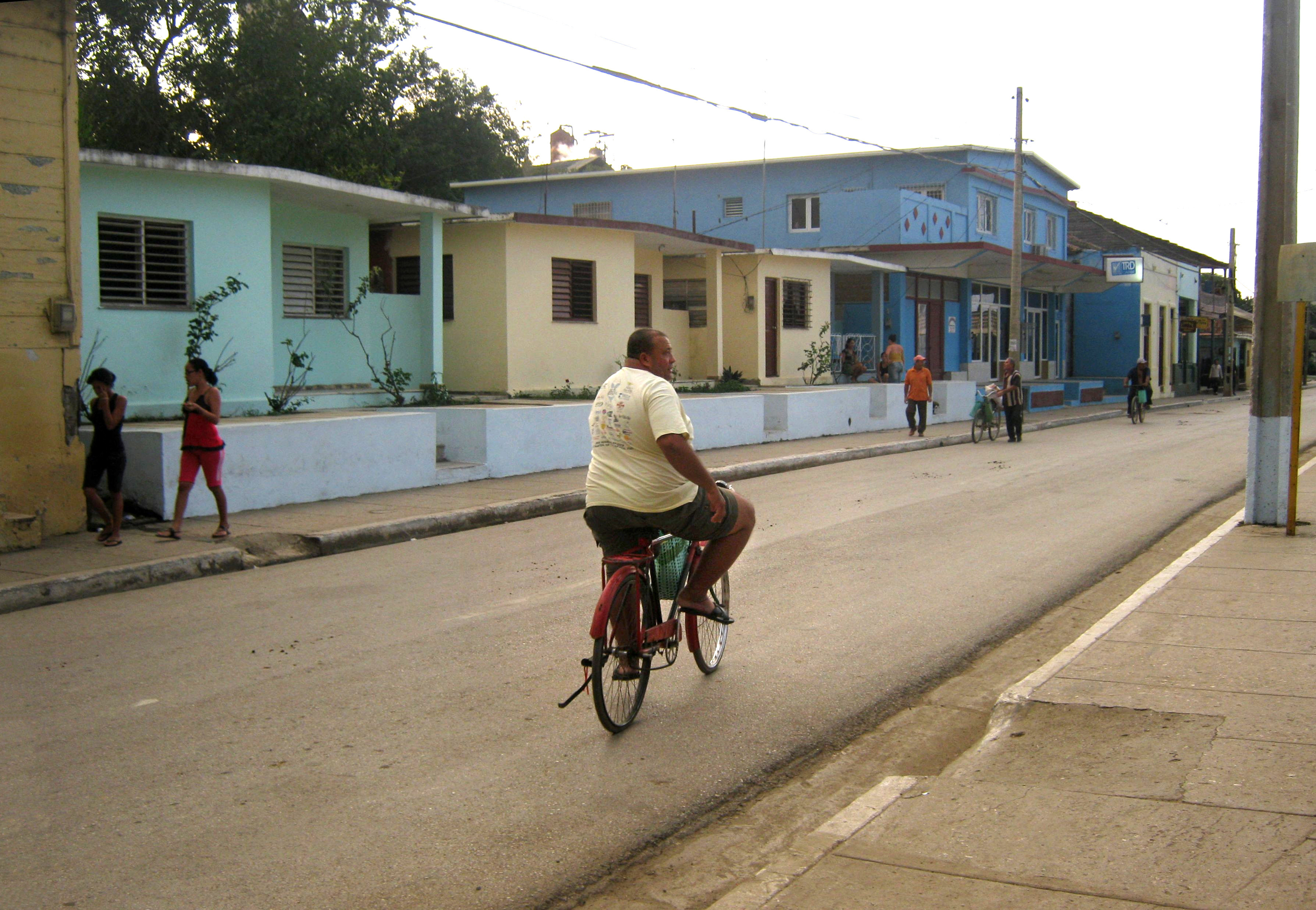
- Calle Céspedes

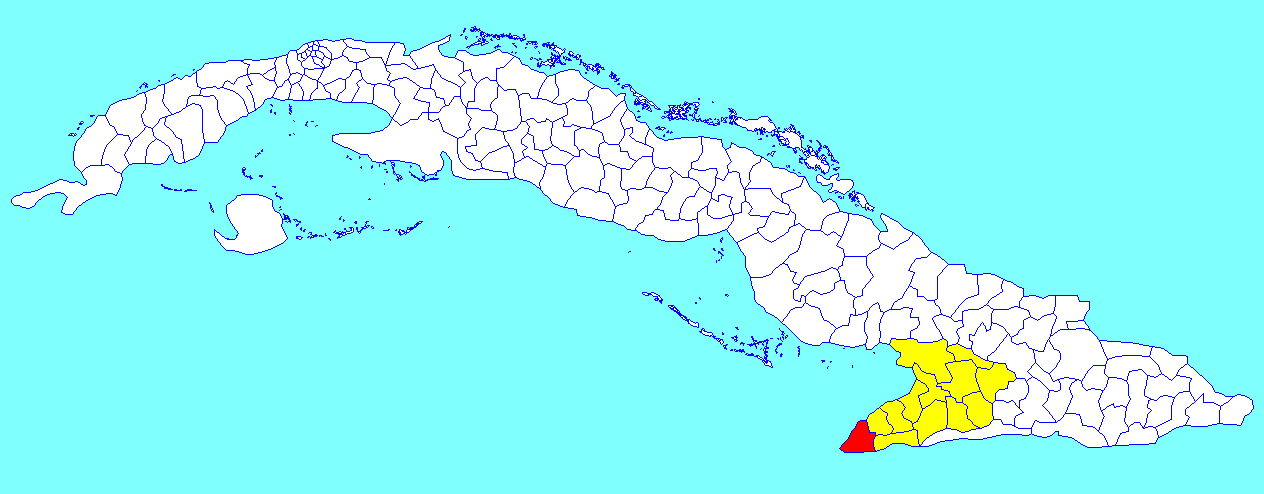
- Niquero municipality (red) within Granma Province (yellow) and Cuba
- Coordinates: 20°02′50″N 77°34′41″W
- Country: Cuba
- Province: Granma
- Established: 1825

Area
  - Total: 582 km^{2} (225 sq mi)
- Elevation: 5 m (16 ft)

Population (2022)
  - Total: 41,198
  - Density: 70.8/km^{2} (183/sq mi)
- Time zone: UTC-5 (EST)
- Area code: +53-23
- Website: https://www.niquero.gob.cu/es/

Niquero is a municipality and town in the Granma Province of Cuba and is the southernmost municipality in the country. It is located in the coastal region of the province, bordering the Gulf of Guacanayabo. Cape Cruz (Cabo Cruz), the westernmost point of the province is located in this municipality.

== History ==
During Cuban Revolution, Niquero was the site of the landing of Granma, a yacht boarded by 82 members of the 26th of July Movement, including Fidel Castro, Raúl Castro, Che Guevara and Camilo Cienfuegos. On 2 December 1956 the yacht, departed from Tuxpan, in Mexico, landed in Los Cayuelos near the beach Playa Las Coloradas, few km in south of the town. The Desembarco del Granma National Park (i.e.: Landing of the Granma N. P.), located in south of the municipality, was named after the event.

== Geography ==
The municipality is divided into the barrios of Belic, Guanito, Jagua, La Marea, El Plátano, Sevilla Abajo, Cabo Cruz, Hondón, Marea de Belic, Alegría de Pío, Estacadero, La Ricardo, etc. Niquero is also the southernmost municipality in all of Cuba.

== Demographics ==
In 2022, the municipality of Niquero had a population of 41,198. With a total area of 582 km^{2} (225 sq mi), it has a population density of 70.9/km^{2} (184/sq mi).

== Transport ==
The town is crossed by the state highway "Circuito Sur de Oriente" (CSO). Cape Cruz has a lighthouse named Faro Vargas.

== Twin Town ==
- Tuxpan (Veracruz, Mexico)

== See also ==
- Municipalities of Cuba
- List of cities in Cuba
