= Pilón, Cuba =

Pilón
- Municipality
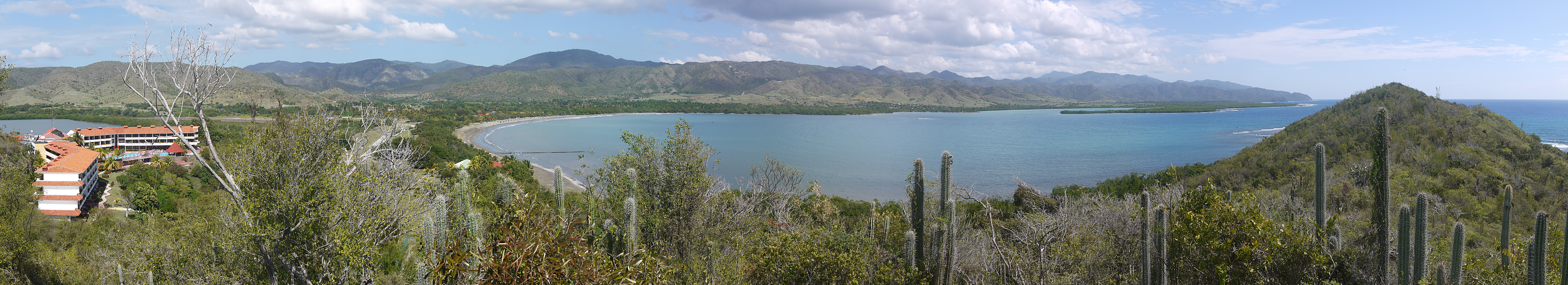

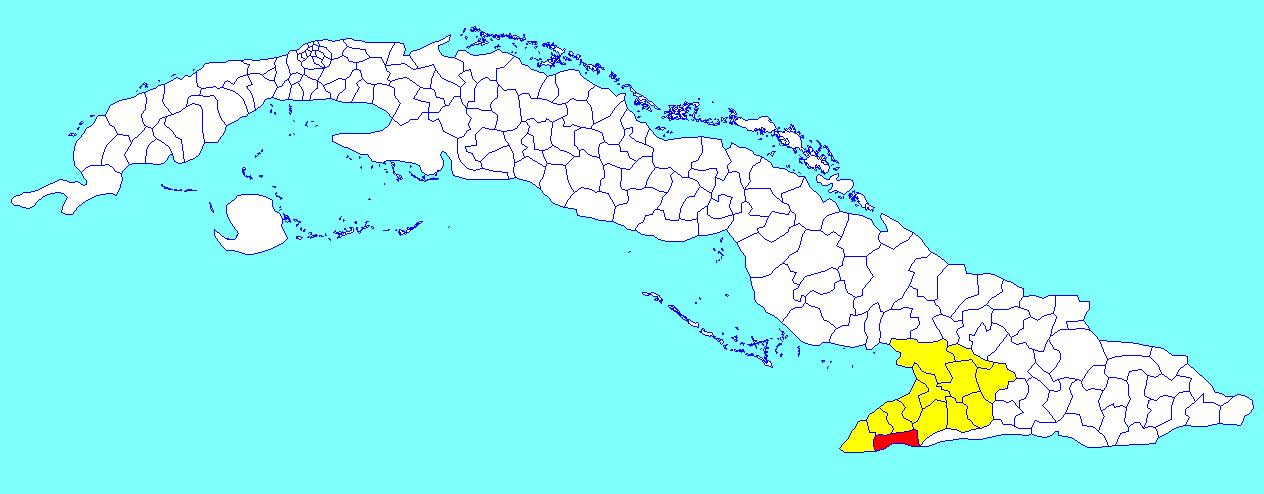
- Pilón municipality (red) within Granma Province (yellow) and Cuba
- Coordinates: 19°54′19″N 77°19′15″W
- Country: Cuba
- Province: Granma

Government
  - President: Martha Dignó Aguilera

Area
  - Total: 462 km^{2} (178 sq mi)
- Elevation: 5 m (16 ft)

Population (2022)
  - Total: 28,752
  - Density: 62.2/km^{2} (161/sq mi)
- Time zone: UTC-5 (EST)
- Area code: +53-23
- Website: https://www.pilon.gob.cu/es/

Pilón is a municipality and town in the Granma Province of Cuba. It is located on the southern coast of Cuba, in an inlet of the Caribbean Sea.

== Demographics ==
In 2022, the municipality of Pilón had a population of 28,752. With a total area of 462 km^{2} (178 sq mi), it has a population density of 64.4/km^{2} (167/sq mi).

== Transport ==
The town is crossed by the state highway "Circuito Sur de Oriente" (CSO).

== See also ==
- Pilón music style
- Municipalities of Cuba
- List of cities in Cuba
