= Granma Province =

Province of Cuba

- Province of Cuba
- Oriental Province of Granma
- Coat of arms

- Country: Cuba
- Capital: Bayamo

Government
  - Governor: Yanetsy Terry Gutiérrez

Area
  - Total: 8,376.79 km^{2} (3,234.30 sq mi)

Population (2014)
  - Total: 1,001,678
  - Density: 119.578/km^{2} (309.705/sq mi)
- Demonym(s): Granmanese, -a
- Time zone: UTC-5 (EST)
- Area code: +53-023
- HDI (2019): 0.756 high · 15th of 16
- Website: https://www.degranma.gob.cu/es/

Granma is one of the provinces of Cuba. Its capital is Bayamo. Other towns include Manzanillo (a port on the Gulf of Guacanayabo) and Pilón.

== History ==
The province takes its name from the yacht Granma, used by Che Guevara and Fidel Castro to land in Cuba with 82 guerrillas on December 2, 1956; until 1976 the area formed part of the larger Oriente Province. The American who sold the guerillas the secondhand yacht in Mexico apparently had named it "Granma" ("Granma", more usually "Grandma", is an affectionate term for a grandmother) after his grandmother. The name of the vessel became an icon for Cuban communism.

The province is full of reminders of the Cuban Revolution, and of the Cuban Wars of Independence; plaques in the mountain commemorate the 1959 struggle against Fulgencio Batista. Other sites, unmarked, include archaeological digs, the sites of several palenques, and the fortified hamlets of escaped slaves. In 2005 Hurricane Dennis destroyed the site of Castro's headquarters at La Plata. There are numerous abandoned gold, silver, and manganese mine sites.

At the 2018 parliamentary election, Granma was the province with the highest proportion of votes recorded for the full list.

On 12 April 2020, Veguitas, a town in Gramna Province, recorded a temperature of 39.7 °C (103.5 °F). This is the highest temperature to have ever been recorded in Cuba.

== Economy ==
The majority of the revenue comes from coffee grown in the forested and mountainous regions of the province. During the coffee harvest soldiers may set up roadblocks to ensure the delivery of the coffee to the government and not to the black market.

== Municipalities ==
Municipality	Population (2004)	Area (km^{2})	Location	Remarks
Bartolomé Masó	53,024	629	20.16861°N 76.94250°W	
Bayamo	222,118	918	20.38167°N 76.64250°W	Provincial capital
Buey Arriba	31,327	452	20.17361°N 76.74917°W	
Campechuela	46,092	577	20.23333°N 77.27889°W	
Cauto Cristo	21,159	550	20.56222°N 76.46944°W	
Guisa	50,923	596	20.26111°N 76.53806°W	
Jiguaní	60,320	646	20.37333°N 76.42222°W	
Manzanillo	130,789	498	20.33972°N 77.10861°W	
Media Luna	35,330	376	20.14444°N 77.43611°W	
Niquero	41,252	582	20.04722°N 77.57806°W	
Pilón	29,751	462	19.90556°N 77.32083°W	
Río Cauto	47,833	1,500	20.56389°N 76.91722°W	
Yara	59,415	576	20.27694°N 76.94694°W	

Source: Population from 2004 Census. Area from 1976 municipal re-distribution.

== Demographics ==
In 2004, the province of Granma had a population of 829,333. With a total area of 8,375.49 km^{2} (3,233.79 sq mi), the province had a population density of 99.0/km^{2} (256/sq mi).

== See also ==
- Oriente
