= Ângela Lago =

Brazilian children's author and illustrator (1945–2017)

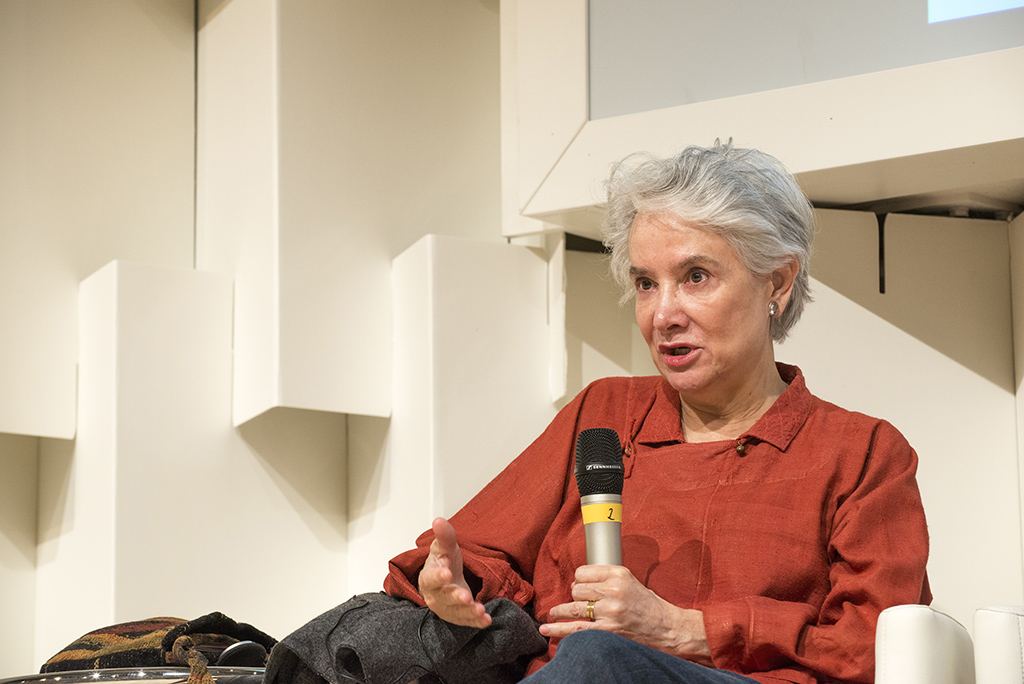
- Born: Ângela Maria Cardoso Lago; 17 December 1945; Belo Horizonte, Minas Gerais, Brazil
- Died: 22 October 2017 (aged 71); Belo Horizonte, Minas Gerais, Brazil
- Occupations: Children's author; Illustrator
- Awards: Biennial of Illustration Bratislava; Jabuti Prize for Literature

Ângela Maria Cardoso Lago (17 December 1945 – 22 October 2017) was a Brazilian children's author and illustrator of poems dedicated to children. She began drawing at the age of three and spent time in the United States, Venezuela and Scotland early in her career. Lago published her first book in 1980 and her last in 2016. She was named the winner of the Best Illustrated Book Award which is issued by the Fundación Nacional del Libros Infantil y Juvenil de Brasil in both 1984 and 1986 and the 1995 and 2007 Biennial of Illustration Bratislava for her books Festa no Céu: Um Conto do Nosso Folclor and Joao Felizardo o rei dos negocios respectively. Lago was also named a recipient of the Jabuti Prize for Literature in each of 1993, 1994, 1995, 1999, 2000, 2001 and 2005.

== Biography ==
On 17 December 1945, Ângela Maria Cardoso Lago was born in Belo Horizonte, which is the capital of the Brazilian state of Minas Gerais. She, sometimes referred to Angela-Lago with a hyphen, was raised in Belo Horizone, and began drawing when she was three years old. Lago studied at the Sion, Santa Marcelina and Sacré-Coeur de Jesus schools until 1963. Five years later, she graduated from the School of Social Service of the Pontifical Catholic University of Minas Gerais, and educated at the school in 1969. After obtaining a sponsorship, Lago worked for three months doing child psycho pedagogy in Denver, Colorado, United States. She went on to work in Venezuela for three years between 1970 and 1973 as a teacher at Ciudad Guayana's School of Social Service. Lago went on to relocate to Edinburgh, Scotland, and enrolled in a graphic arts course.

Upon returning to Brazil, Lago focused on the field of children's literature. She published her first two books in 1980 when she was aged 35, which were called Fio do Riso and Sangue de Barata. Lago published Uni, Duni e Tê in 1982 and Chiquita Bacana e Outras Pequetitas four years later. She shut down her visual advertising studio in 1985, having operated it for a decade, but she went on to incorporate computer programmes into her process of creation by the late 1980s. In 1992, Lago authored the illustrated version of the biblical poem O Cântico dos Cânticos. That same year, she wrote De Morte, a folklore retelling of the story of an elderly male who has three possible requests prior to his death. Lago published Cenas de Rua in 1994, an illustrated book about a child's daily life selling at a lighthouse of a large city.

In 1995, she authored Festa no Céu: Um Conto do Nosso Folclore, and went on to write Um ano novo danado de bom two years later. Lago published ABC doido in 1999, then Indo Não Sei Onde Buscar Não Sei O Quê in 2000; Sete histórias para sacudir o esqueleto in 2002; Muito capeta in 2004; A Casa da Onça e do Bode in 2005; João Felizardo, o Rei dos Negócios in 2006; Um Livro de Horas in 2008; A visita dos 10 monstrinhos and Marginal À Esquerda in each of 2009; ABC Doido in 2010; O caixão rastejante e outras assombrações de família in 2015; and O Caderno do Jardineiro in 2016.

== Awards ==
Lago earned the Best Illustrated Book Award which is issued by the Fundación Nacional del Libros Infantil y Juvenil de Brasil in both 1984 and 1986. She won the Slovakian 1995 Biennial of Illustration Bratislava for her book Festa no Céu: Um Conto do Nosso Folclor and again in 2007 for Joao Felizardo o rei dos negocios. Lago was also named a recipient of the Jabuti Prize for Literature in each of 1993, 1994, 1995, 1999, 2000, 2001, and 2005.

== Personal life ==
She did not have any children. Early in the morning of 22 October 2017, Lago died of the consequences of a pulmonary embolism after falling ill the night before at her home in Belo Horizonte. A wake was held in her honour at Ceremonial Santa Casa in Santa Efigênia de Minas during that same day, and was subsequently cremated at the Belo Vale Cemetery in Santa Luzia.

== Legacy ==
The correspondent for Istoé described Lago as being "seen as one of the most important authors of children's literature in Brazil." Bia Reis and Cristiane Rogerio of O Estado de S. Paulo wrote of Lago: "Angela made us think about the encounter of children's literature with the book object based on the purest desire to experiment." The month of August was dedicated to her by SESC São Caetano which held three meetings about her work in 2018.
