= Ephigenia of Ethiopia =

Christian folk saint virgin from "Asiatic Ethiopia"

Saint Ephigenia of Ethiopia
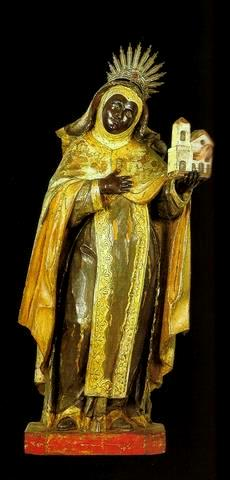
- Santa Ifigênia, wooden statue from Minas Gerais, 18th c. (Museu Afro Brasil).
- Venerated in: Catholic Church; Eastern Orthodox Church
- Feast: September 21 (Roman Catholic Church); November 16 (Eastern Orthodox Church) (Note: Note that she is NOT listed in the official Greek or Russian Synaxaria. Neither is she listed in the Coptic or Ethiopian Synaxaria.)

Ephigenia of Ethiopia or Iphigenia of Ethiopia (Spanish: Efigenia; Portuguese: Ifigénia/Ifigênia; French: Iphigénie; Greek: Ἰφιγένεια), also called Iphigenia of Abyssinia, (Note: Iphigenia is a Greek word that means "strong-born", "born to strength", or "she who causes the birth of strong offspring." The variants of this name include: Iphigenia; Iphigeneia; Iphagenia; Iphegenia; Iphigeniah; Ephigenia; Ephygenia; Ephigenie; Genia.) is a Western folk saint whose life is told in the Golden Legend as a virgin converted to Christianity and then consecrated to God by Matthew the Apostle, who was spreading the Gospel to the region of Ethiopia. (Note: According to the Encyclopædia Britannica (2009 Ultimate Reference Suite): "Tradition notes his ministry in Judaea, after which he supposedly missioned to the East, suggesting Ethiopia and Persia. Legend differs as to the scene of his missions and as to whether he died a natural or a martyr's death.") (Note: In the past there was more than one region that was referred to by the term "Ethiopia". There was the Ethiopia of North Africa ("African Ethiopia"); and another region sometimes called "Asiatic Ethiopia", located either in one of the provinces of Mesopotamia (Assyria and Babylon), or in Ancient Armenia (Colchis). Note: "Ethiopia in Roman History (1-200 AD) Later the term "Ethiopia" would become synonymous not just with the Kushites, but all Africans. Unlike the earlier Greek writers who distinguished Ethiopians from other Africans, Claudius Ptolemy (90–168 AD), a Roman citizen who lived in Alexandria, used "Ethiopia" as a racial term. In his Tetrabiblos: Or Quadripartite, he tried to explain the physical characteristics of people around the world saying, 'They are consequently black in complexion, and have thick and curled hair...and they are called by the common name of Aethiopians.'"; Jerome and the Christian monk Sophronius in the 4th century referred to the region of Colchis as a "Second Ethiopia". Earlier, the Classical Greek historian Herodotus also had written about a colony founded in the region of Colchis, which was inhabited by Ethiopic people, believed to have been brought there by the Egyptian Pharaoh Sesostris.)

== Hagiographic life ==
According to the legend, Ephigenia was the daughter of Aethiopian King Egippus. She was dedicated to God by Saint Matthew the Apostle, who veiled her.

Upon succeeding Eggipus, Aethiopia's new king, Hirtacus, promised Matthew the apostle half of his kingdom if he could persuade Ephigenia to marry him. So, Matthew invited the king to mass the following Sunday where he explained that she was already espoused to the eternal king and therefore could not marry him. Enraged, King Hiraticus left the church and later sent a swordsman to kill Matthew who was standing by the church's altar at the time, thereby making Matthew a martyr.

Not having managed to bend Ephigenia to his will, Hirtacus tried to destroy her home with fire. However, Matthew appeared in spirit and protected the flames from the house, turning them upon the royal palace. The king's son was seized by the devil and the king himself contracted leprosy, eventually killing himself.

After Hiraticus's death, the people chose Ephigenia's brother as their king, who reigned for seventy years, leaving his kingdom to his son who filled Egypt with Christian churches.

== Hagiographic sources and commemoration ==
=== Roman Catholic Church ===
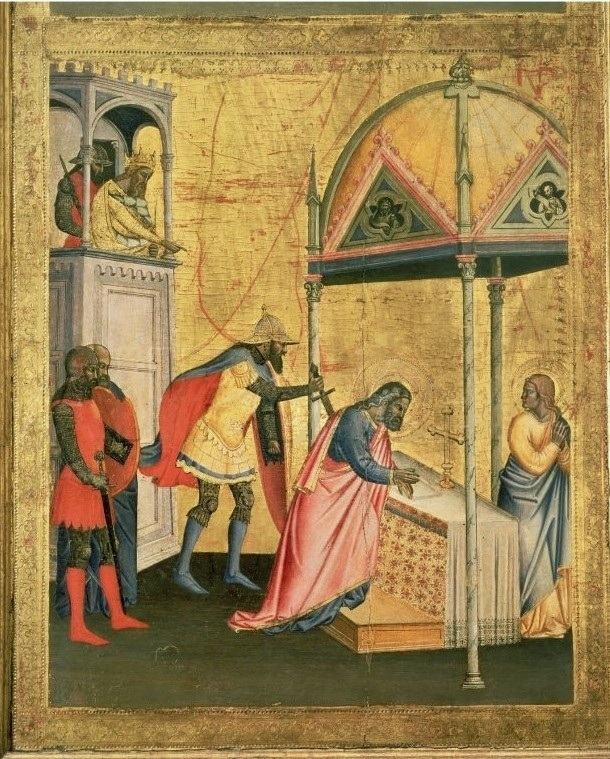
The Martyrdom of St. Matthew, with St. Ifigênia on the right. (Altarpiece of St. Matthew, c.1367-70, Galleria degli Uffizi, Florence)

Saint Ephigenia's feast day in the Roman Catholic Church, along with Saint Matthew's, is on September 21.

The oldest textual source of her Life seems to be the Legenda Aurea (Golden Legend, also known as the Historia Longobardica or Flos Sanctorum) of Italian chronicler Jacobus de Voragine, compiled around 1275 AD. This was an influential book on Renaissance spirituality and the understanding of sanctity which was read not only as a hagiography - a collection of lives of the saints - but as a vade mecum, a manual of asceticism. This is the manner in which Ignatius of Loyola employed it and how Teresa of Ávila advised her spiritual sisters that it should be used. (Note: Although the Golden Legend was rendered unacceptable at the Reformation and after the rise of the new learning, nevertheless it is important to bear in mind that Voragine's specific focus for his work was deliberately on types of saints such as martyrs, ascetics, virgins and people with thaumaturgy and visions, rather than on academics, artists and activists. That is to say that early medieval sources were often not written as objective records of social reality. The authors of these texts often had motives other than simply recording attitudes of the time. Thus to treat them as ethnographies or to approach them from a socio-anthropological perspective would be to misinterpret the period.)

Saint Ephigenia is also listed in the hagiography of the Venetian Bishop Petrus de Natalibus (d. circa 1400), and appears in the 1586 edition of the Roman Martyrology of Cardinal Caesar Baronius, the first authoritative edition of the Roman Martyrology.

The Bollandists included an entry for Saint Iphigenia in their Acta Sanctorum for September 21. She is listed in a German language Bollandist-derived collection of saints of 1869. Professor Roberto Sánchez in his paper 'The Black Virgin: Santa Efigenia, Popular Religion, and the African Diaspora in Peru' notes the following about the Bollandist account:

"The Bollandists, whose work is to historicize and contextualize the lives of the saints, concede that there is some doubt as to whether St. Matthew even went to Ethiopia. They conclude however that the legend is consistent with other sources and apocryphal writings of the period. It is clear that the story of Santa Efígenia is written as a corollary to the keen interest in the martyrdom of St. Matthew. His martyrdom is a significant historical event that has been subject of different versions. In effect, the origins of Santa Efigenia are shrouded in myth, folklore, and a spirited ecclesiastical historical debate."

The Austrian Jesuit missionary and author Francis Xavier Weninger (D.D., S.J.) included the life of Saint Ephigenia in his Lives of the Saints (1876), inscribed within the life of Saint Matthew on September 21:

"...Incontestible writings prove that he preached the Gospel for twenty-three years, partly in Ethiopia, partly in other countries, at the same time founding almost innumerable Churches, and supplying them with priests and bishops, in order to preserve the faith he had taught... ...Iphigenia, the eldest daughter of the newly converted king of Ethiopia, had not only become a Christian, but also, with the knowledge and consent of the holy Apostle, had consecrated her virginity to the Almighty, after having frequently heard the Saint preach on the priceless value of purity, and exhort others to guard and preserve it. Her example was followed by many other virgins, who, choosing the princess as their superior, lived together and occupied their time in prayer and work..."

Her listing in the Roman Martyrology (1916 English edition) states the following:

"In Ethiopia, St. Iphigenia, virgin, who being baptized and consecrated to God by the blessed apostle Matthew, ended her holy life in peace."

The Book of Saints (1921) compiled by the Benedictine Monks of St Augustine's Abbey, Ramsgate has the following entry for Saint Iphigenia:

"A Virgin converted to Christianity and afterwards consecrated to God by St. Matthew the Evangelist, Apostle of Ethiopia. The extant Acts of St. Matthew are however so untrustworthy that no reliance can be placed on the particulars given therein of St. Iphigenia and others of the first fruits of the Gospel in Ethiopia."

The Slaves of the Immaculate Heart of Mary also recount the life of Saint Iphigenia:

"Saint Matthew, the Publican, preached the gospel in Ethiopia. He is, as Bartholomew for Armenia, an Apostle of a Nation, because, not only did he make many converts (as did all the Twelve) but he converted the king of Ethiopia by the stupendous miracle of raising the king's daughter from the dead. Her name was Iphigenia and she is listed as a saint in the Martyrology. After her resurrection from the dead, with Saint Matthew's approval, she took a vow of virginity. This so enraged the next king, Hirtacus, who wanted to marry her, that he had Matthew slain at the altar while offering Mass. The year was 68. Saint Matthew's feast day is September 21."

Saint Ephigenia is also listed in Our Sunday Visitor's Encyclopedia of Saints (2014, 2nd edition):

"Iphigenia (d. first century). A virgin from Ethiopia who was converted by St. Matthew . No other reliable details about her are extant. Feast day: September 21."

=== Anglican Catholic Church ===
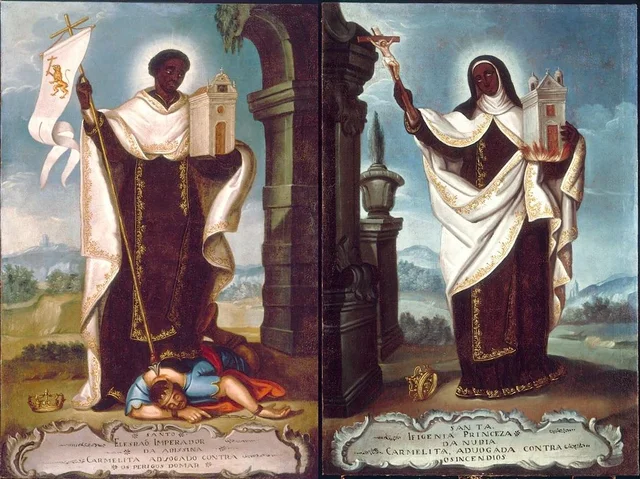
Brazilian painting of Ephigenia beside Kaleb of Axum as he slays the king of Himyar. He carries a banner of the lion of judah holding a cross, attested in the late medieval period.

The Anglican Catholic Church records the memory of Saint Ephigenia, contained within the Life of Saint Matthew, citing The Anglican Breviary (1955):

"Although many parts of Christendom have delighted to claim this Apostle as the founder of their Churches, the usual tradition is that he went into the regions south of the Caspian Sea, (which same are in this instance called Ethiopia) where he preached the Gospel and confirmed the same by many wondrous deeds. The greatest of these is told on this wise: that he raised to life the king's daughter, Iphigenia, whereby the royal family was converted to Christ; that after the king died Hirtacus his successor demanded Iphigenia to wife; and that she (who through Matthew's teaching had vowed herself to God) rejected Hirtacus in pursuance of her vow; for which reason Matthew was by royal order put to death whilst celebrating the holy Mysteries, whereby he fulfilled his apostleship in martyrdom."

=== Eastern Orthodox Church ===
Significantly, the Life of Saint Matthew the Apostle in traditional Orthodox Synaxaria does not directly mention Saint Ephigenia by name, although the Synaxaria do record Saint Matthew's travels to "Ethiopia," that he enlightened the area, and was martyred there. The Orthodox Synaxarion according to the tradition of Nikephoros Kallistos Xanthopoulos (c. 1320), states that after being cruelly treated by the Parthians and Medes, St. Matthew then went to spread the Gospel to a certain city called "Mirmena / Myrmena," (Note: "Mirmena / Myrmena" is referenced in Abraham Rees' The Cyclopædia; Or, Universal Dictionary of Arts, Sciences, and Literature (1819): "MYRMENA, in Ancient Geography, a town supposed to have been in Ethiopia, inhabited by Anthropophagi; whose prince, according to Nicephorus, was converted by St. Matthew to the Christian faith.") supposedly in Ethiopia, described as a land that was inhabited by tribes of cannibals:

"After departing from Jerusalem, the holy Apostle Matthew preached the glad tidings of the Gospel in many lands. Proclaiming the good news of Christ, he passed through Macedonia, Syria, Persia, Parthia and Media, establishing Churches there and in other places...He travelled all about Ethiopia, which had fallen to him by lot, and enlightened it with the light of the knowledge of the Gospel. Finally, guided by the Holy Spirit, he arrived in the land of the cannibals, who were a dark-skinned and savage people. There he entered a city known as Mirmena and, having converted several souls to Christ, he appointed Platon, his fellow traveller, to be their bishop, and built a little church...The wife and son of Fulvian, the prince of that city, were possessed by demons...The apostle rebuked the unclean spirits and expelled them; and those who were healed fell down before the apostle and meekly followed after him..."

Be that as it may, a certain "Saint Iphigenia the Virgin-Martyr" is yet referenced in the Greek Orthodox calendar for November 16 (being the same feast day as Saint Matthew the Apostle in the Orthodox Church). Nowhere else is her memory referenced.

The Prologue from Ohrid compiled by Nikolai Velimirovic (1928) does not include St. Ephigenia, either on her own or within the life of Saint Matthew.

The Antiochian Orthodox Christian Archdiocese of North America does include St. Ephigenia of Ethiopia on its calendar of Saints, along with her traditional Latin biography, "commemorated on November 16 (also on September 21)". Similarly, Saints Mary and Martha Monastery in Wagener, South Carolina (OCA), does list St. Iphigenia, Princess of Ethiopia on the Western date of September 21, although the Orthodox Church in America's (OCA) online Synaxarion does not mention St. Iphigenia in its recollection of the Life of St. Matthew the Evangelist, including his period in Ethiopia.

=== Oriental Orthodox Churches ===
Saint Ephigenia of Ethiopia does not appear to be listed in either the Coptic Synaxarium or in the Ethiopian Synaxarium, either on her own, or within the life of Saint Matthew. (Note: Her absence in both the Coptic and Ethiopian synaxaria lends support to the suggestion that it was indeed the region known as "Asiatic Ethiopia" that St. Matthew visited, rather than African Ethiopia.)

== Historical veneration ==
=== Spain ===
The Carmelites of Cádiz, Andalusia, had a devotion to Santa Ifigênia. In Cádiz, African blacks organized their own religious association, the "Confradía de Nuestra Señora de la Salud, San Bello y Santa Ifigênia", formed in El Puerto de Santa María in 1575. From Cádiz, her devotion spread to Portugal and from there to Brazil.

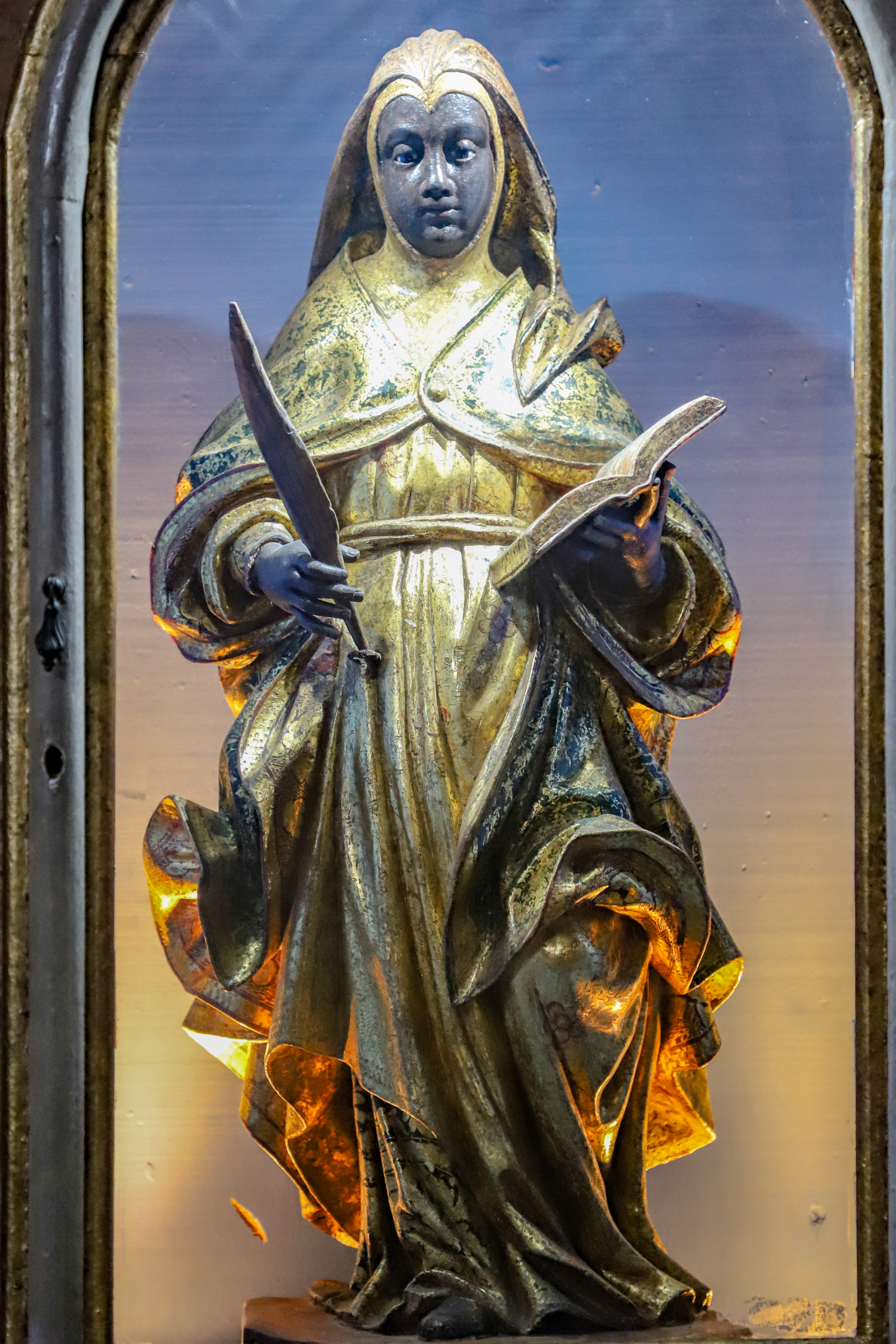
Image of Saint Ephigenia of Ethiopia, Igreja de Nossa Senhora do Rosário dos Pretos, Salvador, Bahia, Brazil.

=== Brazil ===
The Brazilian-born priest José Pereira de Santana devoted a definitive, two-volume work to Elesbaan and Ephigenia, published respectively in 1735 and 1738 at Lisbon. He considered them the two pillars of African sanctity and refashioned them as saints of his own Carmelite order. Elesbaan represented the triumph of Christianity over Judaism in the person of Dunaan, while Ephigenia stood for the early, voluntary acceptance of the Gospel in Africa.

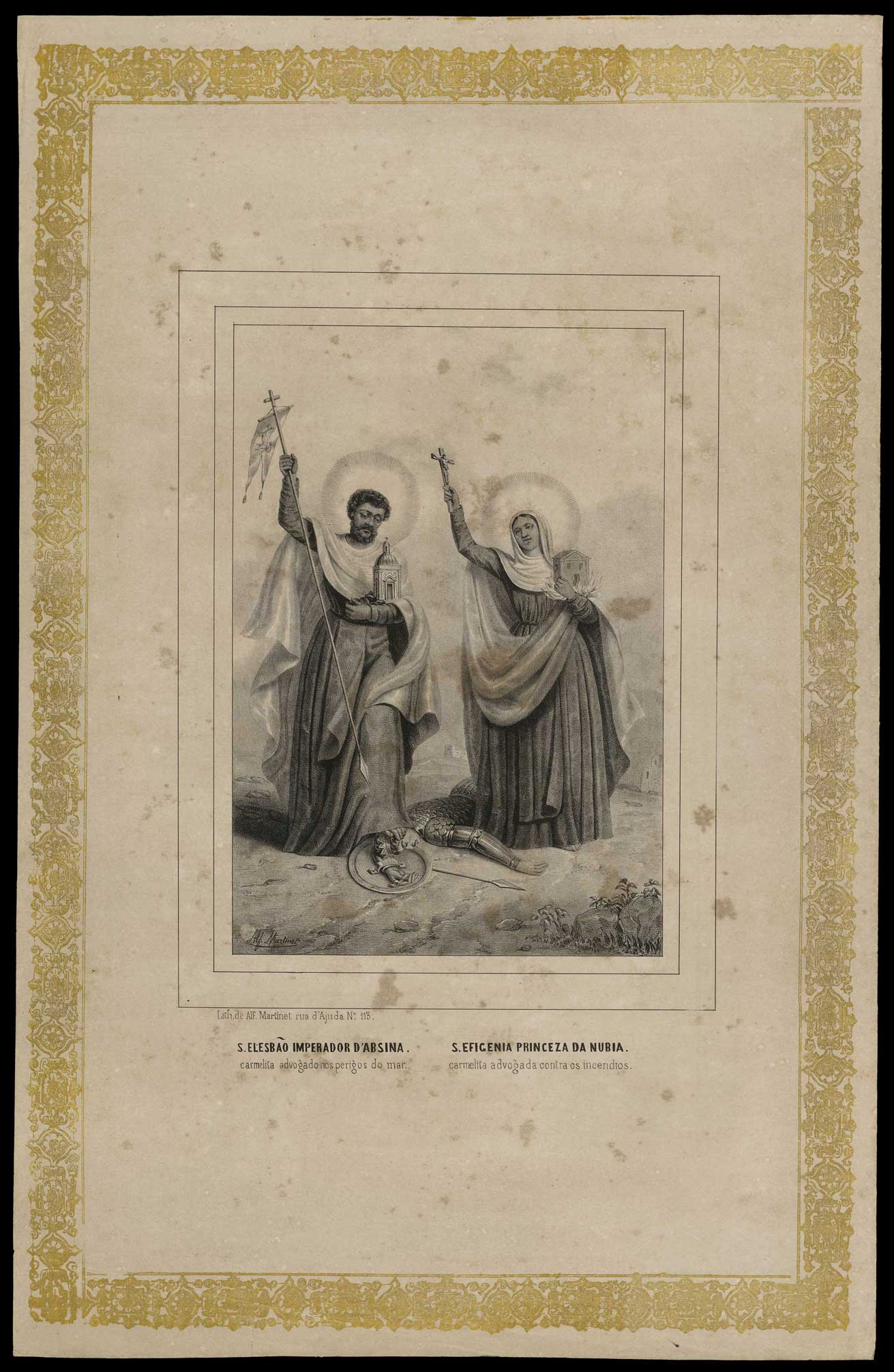
St. Elesbaan (Caleb), King of Ethiopia with S. Efigênia. (National Library of Brazil)

A "Venerable Brotherhood of Saint Elesbão and Saint Efigênia" (Note: (in Portuguese) Venerável Irmandade de Santo Elesbão e Santa Efigênia. (A Catholic brotherhood located in downtown Rio de Janeiro).) was founded in Rio de Janeiro on May 7, 1740, by free black slaves from Cape Verde, Coast of the Mine, São Tomé Island, and Mozambique. The cult of those two Saints is believed to have been brought by the slaves themselves. Black brotherhoods in Roman Catholic societies in the New World relied upon a few black patron saints, including Santa Efigenia, Santo Antonio de Catagerona (d. 1549), and Sao Benedito (d. 1589). (Note: They were referred as irmandade in Brazil; and confradia or cabildo in Spanish America. Professor Roberto Sánchez states that "these cults date back to (the) seventeenth and eighteenth centuries and are part of the variety and depth of Afro-Brazilian identification with icons and religious practices of the African diaspora, as well as the use of these cultural practices by Portuguese Carmelites as colonial tools of conversion, orientation, and education.")

Saint Iphigenia was also honored in joyous religious festivals and processions. According to Brazilian sociologist and anthropologist Gilberto Freyre, writing in 1922, "the festival of Saint Ephigenia, a sort of black Madonna, was enjoyed to the utmost by the colored folks, whose "consciousness of kind" was ably aroused by the priests."

On November 20, 1995, Brazilians observed the 300th anniversary of the death of Zumbi of Palmers, the last ruler of Palmares, regarded as one of the first freedom fighters of the Americas. In Belo Horizonte a procession of congados (pt) took place on the evening of November 23, 1996, honoring Nossa Senhora do Rosario, Saint Benedict the Moor, and Saint Iphigenia with processions of precision marching, singing, dancing and the use of percussion instruments. (Note: "In Minas Gerais and other central-south and southern states, for example, spirituality of African origin is manifest in a form of Afro-Catholicism called Congada or Congado. Its African origins are from what are now the two Congos and Angola in West Central Africa and Mozambique in South East Africa...Unlike the veneration of African spiritual beings in Bahia, congadeiros in Minas Gerais seek blessings and guidance from Catholic saints. The spiritual beings of Congada are the Virgin Mary as Our Lady of the Rosary, and Afro-Catholic Saint Benedict, patron of Palermo in Sicily, whose parents were Ethiopian; and Saint Ephigenia from Ethiopia.") The combined reverence for the Catholic saints and the performance of African ritual elements are evidence of the co-existence of Catholic religious traditions and the preservation of an African cultural memory in Minas Gerais. (Note: "Each group has a unique uniform or costume and some include folkloric elements such as the "bum-bum boi"...This event, in honor of Zumbi, marked the first time that the congados (pt) came together from all over Brazil.")

=== Peru ===
The diaspora of Santa Efígenia from Ethiopia to the Americas was part of the dispersal of African popular religious expressions that connected Africa, Europe, and the Americas.

A late twentieth century movement to gain national recognition of Afro-Peruvian cultural contributions in Cañete Province focused on Santa Efigenia, which included a statue and an eighteenth century wall-sized baroque painting of her by Peruvian artist Cristóbal Lozano. (Note: La Apoteosis de Santa Ifigenia. Cristóbal Lozano, 1763. Capilla de La Quebrada, Cañete, Peru.) These artistic representations located in a private chapel on the hacienda La Quebrada in San Luis de Cañete were presented as legitimate artifacts of Santa Efigenia's status as a folk or popular saint central to their construction of an Afro-Peruvian black identity and culture of devotion.

On August 20, 1994, Sabino Cañas, an Afro-Peruvian community leader, organized a small group of followers from the surrounding villages of Cañete and Chincha to establish the Santa Efigenia Association, and named her as Patroness of National Black Art, even as they struggled to craft a coherent historical narrative of Santa Efigenia's origins. (Note: According to professor Roberto Sánchez: "They had multiple goals in mind when they petitioned the municipality to create an association and name her as patroness and protector of National Black Art. They seized upon an opportunity provided by a regional economic development project promoted by the Ministry of Industry and Tourism to market Afro-Peruvian culture through a series of festivals, including religious cultural expressions. Their need to authenticate their cultural ownership of Santa Efígenia required a historical explanation of her origins and diaspora. Their sketchy attempts contributed more to mystifying than to clarifying, yet their rewriting is part of an African diaspora that weaves tradition, fact, and fiction to serve more pragmatic aims.") According to the Association's popular history, Santa Efígenia has been at the hacienda of La Quebrada since approximately 1741.

An annual celebration of Santa Efígenia is held on September 21 each year, with processions made in homage to Santa Ifigenia in the district of San Luis de Canete. The Association produces a program flyer that introduces a brief history of the patron saint and focuses on her diffusion and popularity in Brazil, Cuba, and Peru. The festival has grown in popularity as the Afro-Peruvian community of artists, musicians, writers, sports figures, and admirers have converged on Cañete each September in growing numbers.

=== France ===
In honor of Saint Ephigenia, a virgin-martyr of 1794 had taken her name. A professed religious of the Order of St. Benedict that was martyred during the French Revolution in 1794 was known as "Sister Iphigénie of Saint Matthew". Her name was Blessed Marie-Gabrielle-Françoise-Suzanne de Gaillard de Lavaldène (1761–1794), also known as "Francesca Maria Susanna", "Sister Iphigénie of Saint Matthew" or "Ifigenia di San Matteo de Gaillard de la Valdène", and she was one of the Martyrs of Orange who was guillotined on 7 July 1794 in Orange, Vaucluse, France. She was beatified 10 May 1925 by Pope Pius XI and she is commemorated on July 7.

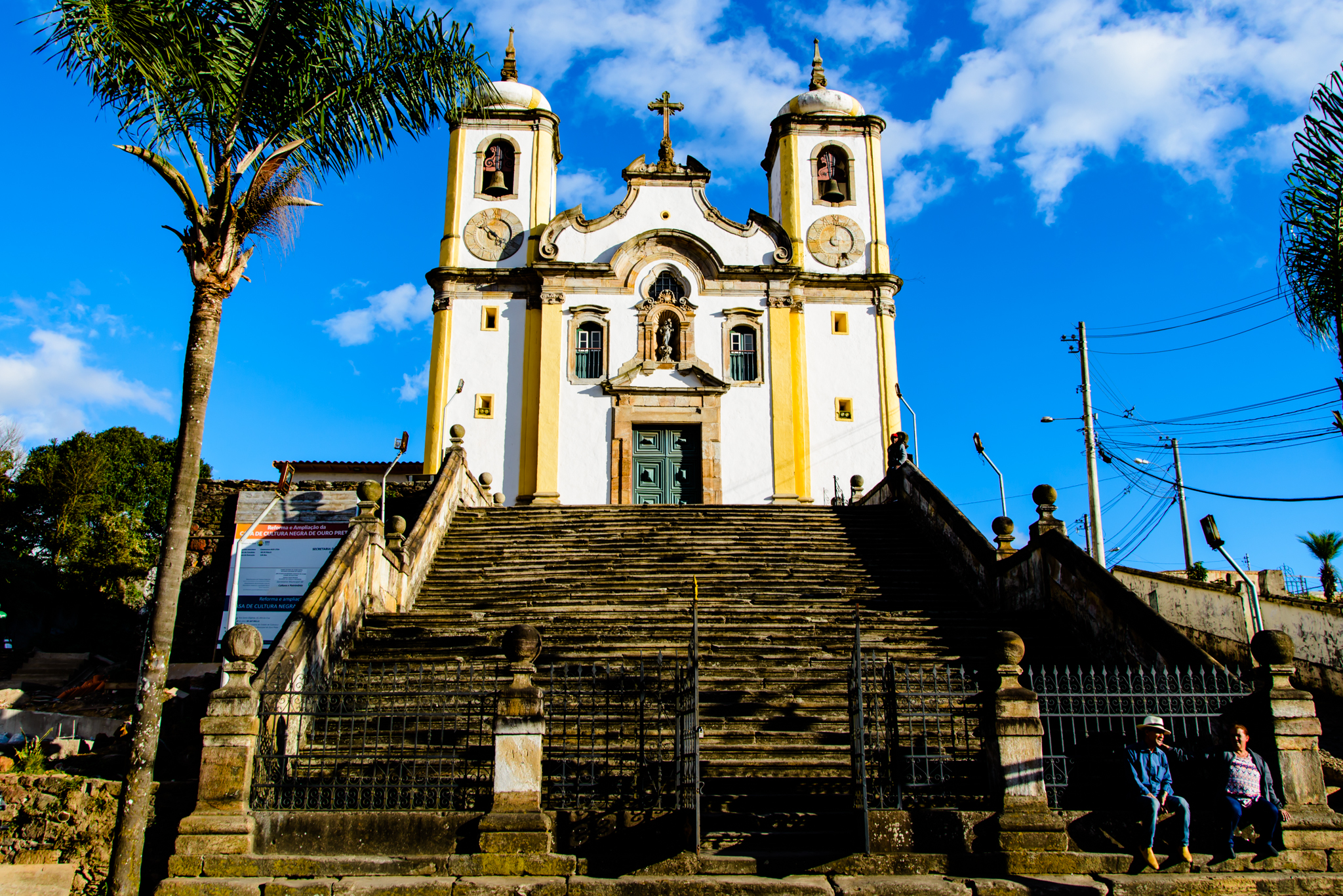
Igreja de Santa Efigênia dos Pretos, Ouro Preto, Minas Gerais, Brazil.

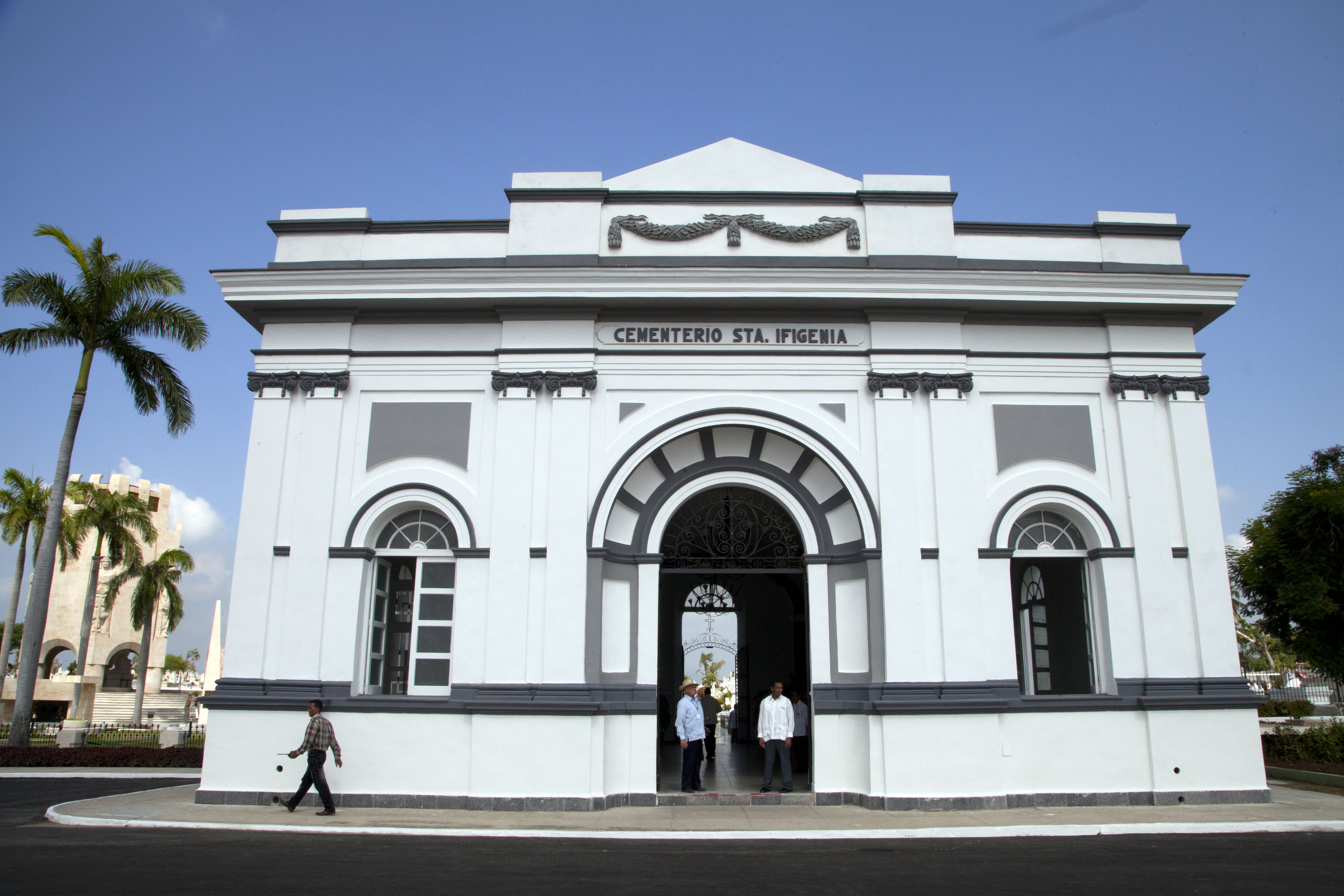
Santa Ifigenia cemetery, Santiago de Cuba.

== Churches ==
- Igreja de Santa Efigênia dos Pretos, Ouro Preto, Minas Gerais, Brazil, founded in 1785. According to tradition, the church of St. Ephigenia in Vila Rica was built largely from the proceeds of gold dust washed out of their hair by devout black women. The building of the Igreja Nossa Senhora Santa Efigênia no Alto Cruz (Our Lady of Saint Efigênia of the High Cross), organized under Chico Rei, lasted some thirty years and involved the artistic collaboration of the famous mulatto sculptor Antônio Francisco "Aleijadinho" Lisboa.
- Paróquia Nossa Senhora da Conceição - Santa Ifigênia (pt), São Paulo, Brazil, founded in 1809.

== Placenames ==
- Santa Efigênia de Minas, a municipality in the state of Minas Gerais in the Southeast region of Brazil.
- Santa Ifigenia, a town in the Honduran department of Ocotepeque (department).
- Santa Efigenia, a small town located in the Municipality of San Pedro Tapanatepec, in the State of Oaxaca, Mexico.
- Santa Ifigenia Cemetery, in Santiago de Cuba, Cuba. Inaugurated in February 1868.

== See also ==
- Folk saint
