= Teté Puebla =

Puebla
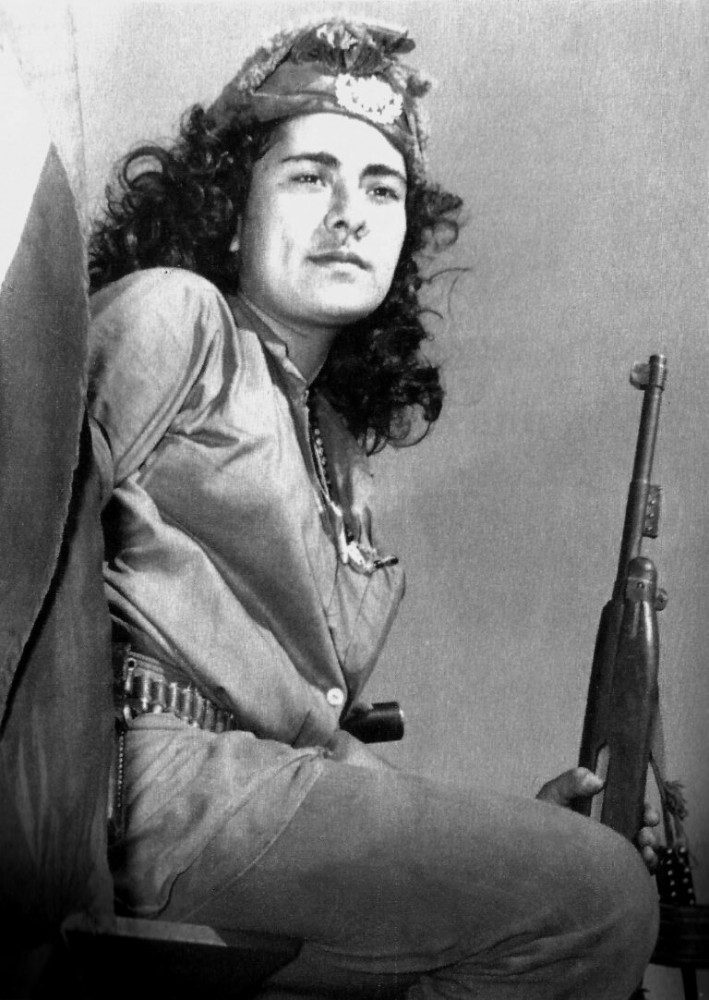
- Teté Puebla riding in the Freedom Caravan to Havana after the Triumph of the Revolution, 1959
- Born: Delsa Esther Puebla Viltre; 9 December 1940 (age 85); Yara, Cuba
- Occupations: Guerilla fighter; Member of Cuba's parliament
- Spouse: Raúl Castro Mercader
- Children: three

Delsa Esther Puebla Viltre (born 9 December 1940), known by the nom de guerre Teté Puebla, is a Cuban politician and former guerrilla fighter. She is the head of Cuba's Office of Veterans' Affairs (Spanish: Oficina de Atención a Combatientes) and a member of Cuba's parliament, the National Assembly of People's Power, representing Havana. During the Cuban Revolution, Puebla fought as one of Fidel Castro's guerillas in the Sierra Maestra mountains as part of the Mariana Grajales Women's Platoon. In July 1996 she was promoted to brigadier general in the Cuban Revolutionary Armed Forces, becoming the first female general in the nation's history.

== Early life ==
Puebla was born in Yara, in the foothills of the Sierra Maestra mountains where she would later fight as a guerrilla. Her large peasant family had nine children and Puebla was raised by her grandparents.

== Cuban Revolution ==
The brutal repression of dictator Fulgencio Batista's death squads in Yara drove Puebla to support anti-government dissidents from an early age. In 1956, she left school in Manzanillo to join the 26th of July Movement (M-26-7), the communist insurgents fighting to overthrow Batista's regime. Her clandestine support for the movement included smuggling weapons, medicine, and money to the rebels. Puebla also participated in low-level sabotage against the government, cutting power lines and slashing police car tires. In 1957 she went into the Sierra Maestra mountains to join the rebel army after her collaboration with the rebels had been revealed to the government by a captured M-26-7 member. In the Sierras she met and worked with the insurgent organizer Celia Sánchez, the "mother" of the rebel forces.

The rebel leader Fidel Castro formed the Mariana Grajales Women's Platoon in September 1958, a group of thirteen women whom he personally taught to shoot. Castro declared that the platoon would be his personal bodyguard unit. Puebla was made second-in-command. The Marianas participated in combat on multiple occasions and acted as message runners for the army. They had been issued with M1 carbines, which were lighter in weight and easier to carry than the weapons that were typically issued to rebel guerrilla fighters.

== Post-war ==
In January 1959, after Batista's flight from Cuba and the victory of Castro's revolutionaries, Puebla returned to Santiago de Cuba. She was appointed as the director of the Department for the Care of War Victims, and throughout the 1960s, she took care of war victims from Batista's regime, Escambray rebellion and victims from Bay of Pigs Invasion sponsored by the United States.

Puebla also served in a number of government and military roles throughout the 1960s and 1970s including stints at the Department of Education. In 1985 she was appointed director of the Department for Care of Veterans and Martyrs of the Revolution. In 1994 she was promoted to colonel, and on 24 July 1996, she was promoted to brigadier general, becoming the first woman general officer in Cuba's history.

As of 2017, Puebla is a member of the National Assembly of People's Power, the Cuban parliament. On 2 December 2001, she was awarded Hero of the Republic of Cuba by Fidel Castro, Cuba's highest honor.

== Personal life ==
In 1960, Puebla married Raúl Castro Mercader, a brigadier general of the Cuban Revolutionary Armed Forces. They have three children: Fidel, Raúl and Laura.

== See also ==
- Mariana Grajales Cuello
- Celia Sánchez
