= Santa Ifigenia Cemetery =

Cemetery in Santiago de Cuba, Cuba

Coordinates: 20°2′08.1″N 75°50′25.1″W

- Cementerio Santa Ifigenia
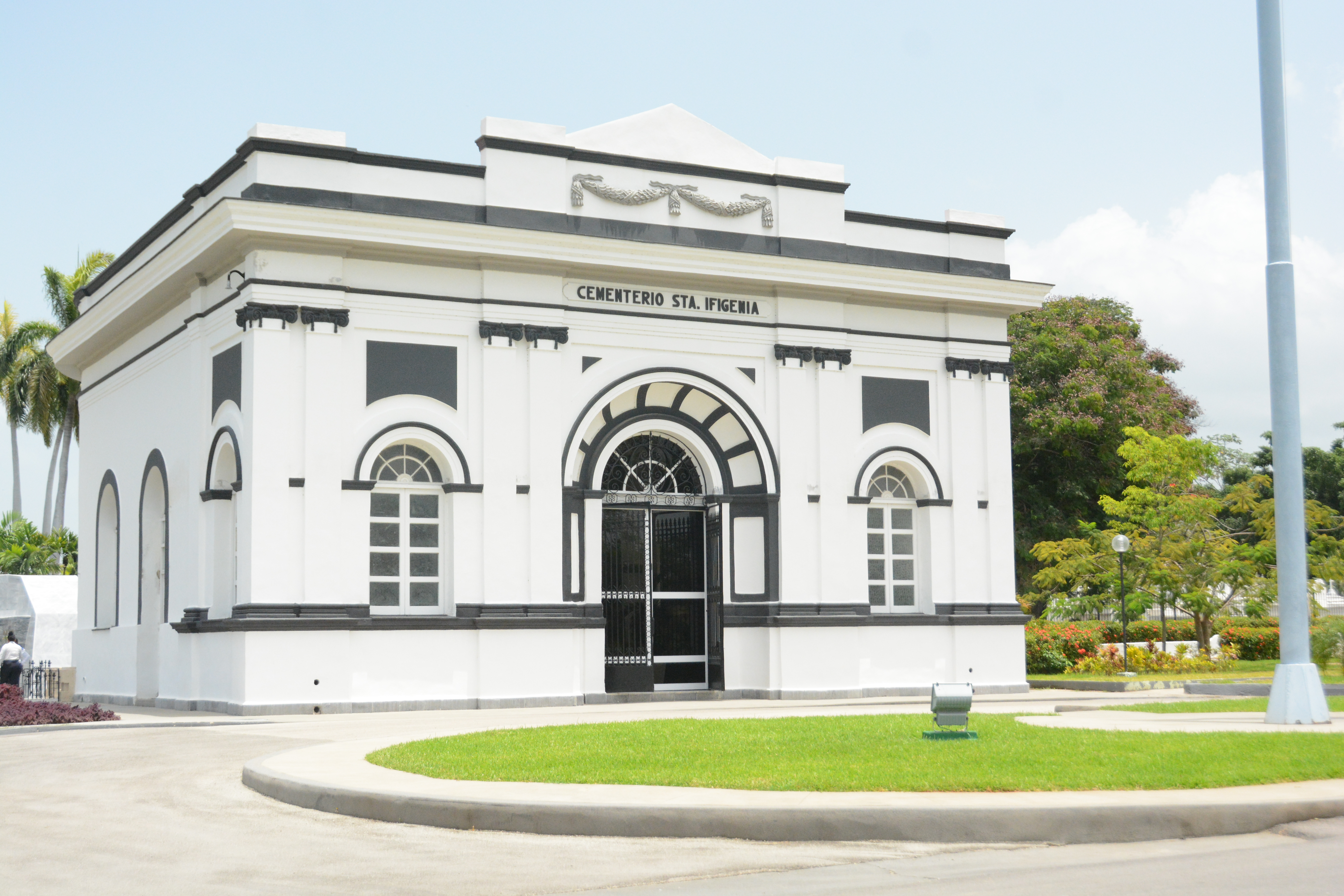
- Portico of the Santa Ifigenia Cemetery.
- Interactive map of Santa Ifigenia Cemetery
- Location: Ave. Capitán Raúl Perozo, Distrito José Martí, Santiago de Cuba; Cuba
- Type: Cemetery

The Santa Ifigenia Cemetery, officially Santa Ifigenia Patrimonial Cemetery (Spanish: Cementerio Patrimonial Santa Ifigenia), is the cemetery, necropolis and main pantheon of the Cuban Oriente and the city of Santiago de Cuba. It is located west of the city, more specifically in the José Martí district and stands out for being the resting place of the remains of a large number of heroes and famous figures in the history and culture of Cuba, including José Martí and Fidel Castro. The signature resting place is that of Martí, Cuba's national hero, whose mausoleum is guarded by Cuban soldiers at the entrance. At every half hour, visitors can see the changing of the guard.

== History ==
It was inaugurated in February 1868 and in April of the same year the first burials took place. It is named after St. Ephigenia of Ethiopia.

It was declared a national monument in 1937 and ratified by Fidel Castro's government in 1979. The cemetery opened in 1868 to replace smaller Cemetery of Santa Ana. It contains the remains of 32 generals from Cuba's wars of independence and those of most of those who assaulted the Moncada Barracks.

The most important mausoleum is dedicated to José Julián Martí Pérez, the National Hero, who was buried together with the other mambises veterans from 1947 to 1951, with the current tomb being inaugurated on June 30, 2002, which is guarded by a permanent guard of honour since 2002. The cemetery is reached by public transit from bus stops across Avenida Capitán Raúl Perozo. Parking is available for buses at the entrance of the cemetery.

On November 25, 2016, the then President of the Council of State and Ministers Raúl Castro, informed Cuba and the world of the death of his brother Fidel, historic leader of the Cuban Revolution and who led the country for almost five decades, and on the day December 4, 2016, his burial took place in this cemetery.

== Notable burials and memorials ==
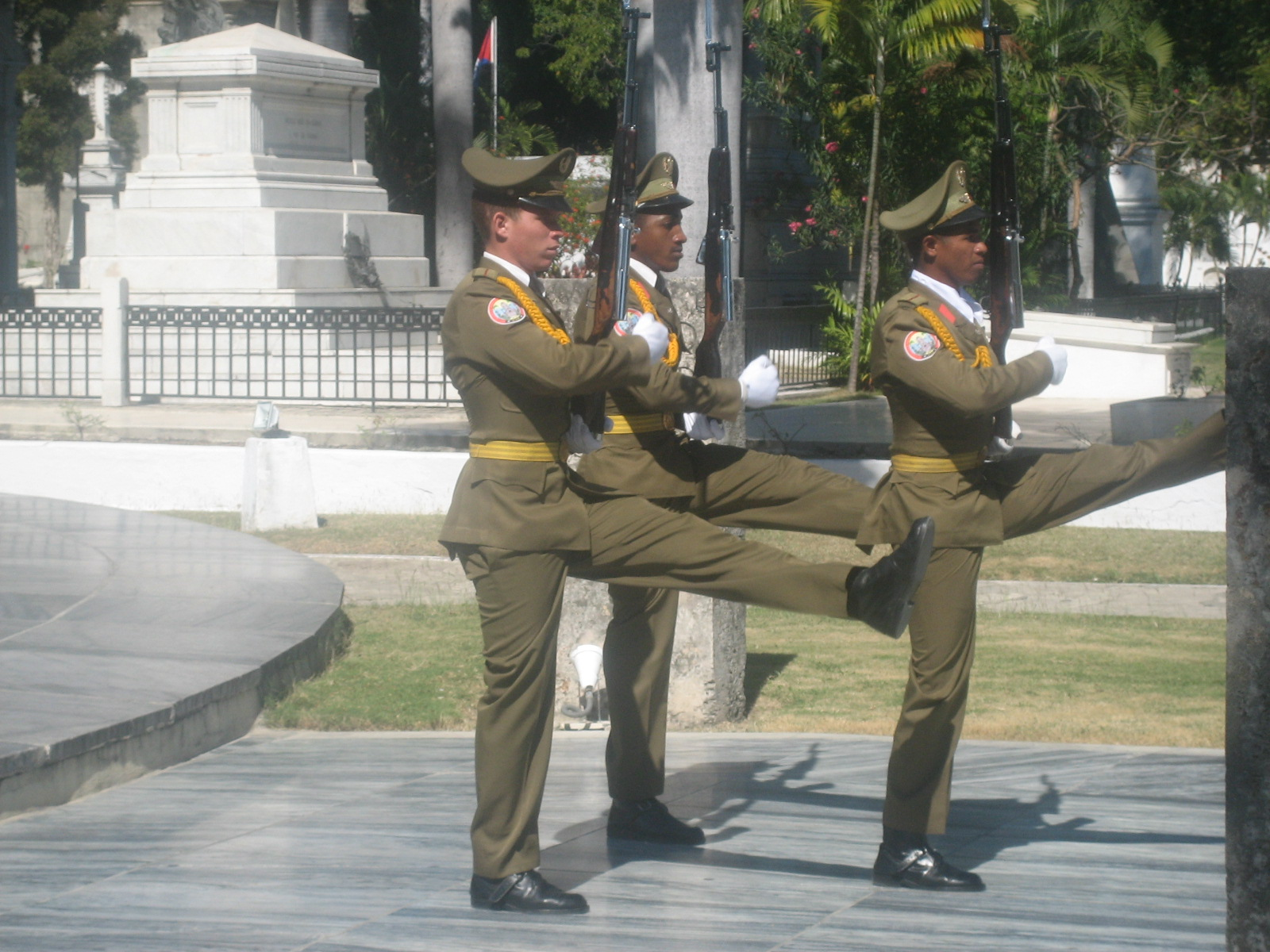
Changing of the Guards in Santa Ifigenia Cemetery.

- José Martí (d. 1895) – National Hero
- Carlos Manuel de Céspedes – Father of the Nation
- Fidel Castro (d. 2016) – Leader of Cuba and revolutionary
- Dominga Moncada – General Guillermón Moncada’s mother
- Facundo Bacardi – Founder of Bacardi
- Emilio Bacardi – son of the founder of Bacardi fortune Facundo Bacardi
- Elvira Cape de Bacardi, Emilio's wife
- Frank País (d. 1957) – Cuban revolutionary
- María Cabrales – Wife of Antonio Maceo
- Mariana Grajales – Maceo's mother
- José Maceo
- Nikolai Yavorsky (d. 1947) – Russian born choreographer
- Mario García Menocal – Third President of Cuba
- Evaristo Estenoz – Leader of the 1912 Negro Rebellion
- Tomás Estrada Palma – First President of Cuba
- Compay Segundo – Guitarist, singer, and composer
- Ñico Saquito - Songwriter, composer, guitarist and singer
- Pantheon of the Dead for the Defense
- Pantheon to the Martyrs of Virginius
- Pantheon of the Revolution's Martyrs
- The Heroes' Altarpiece
- Tomb of Martyrs of San Juan de Wilson

== Gallery ==
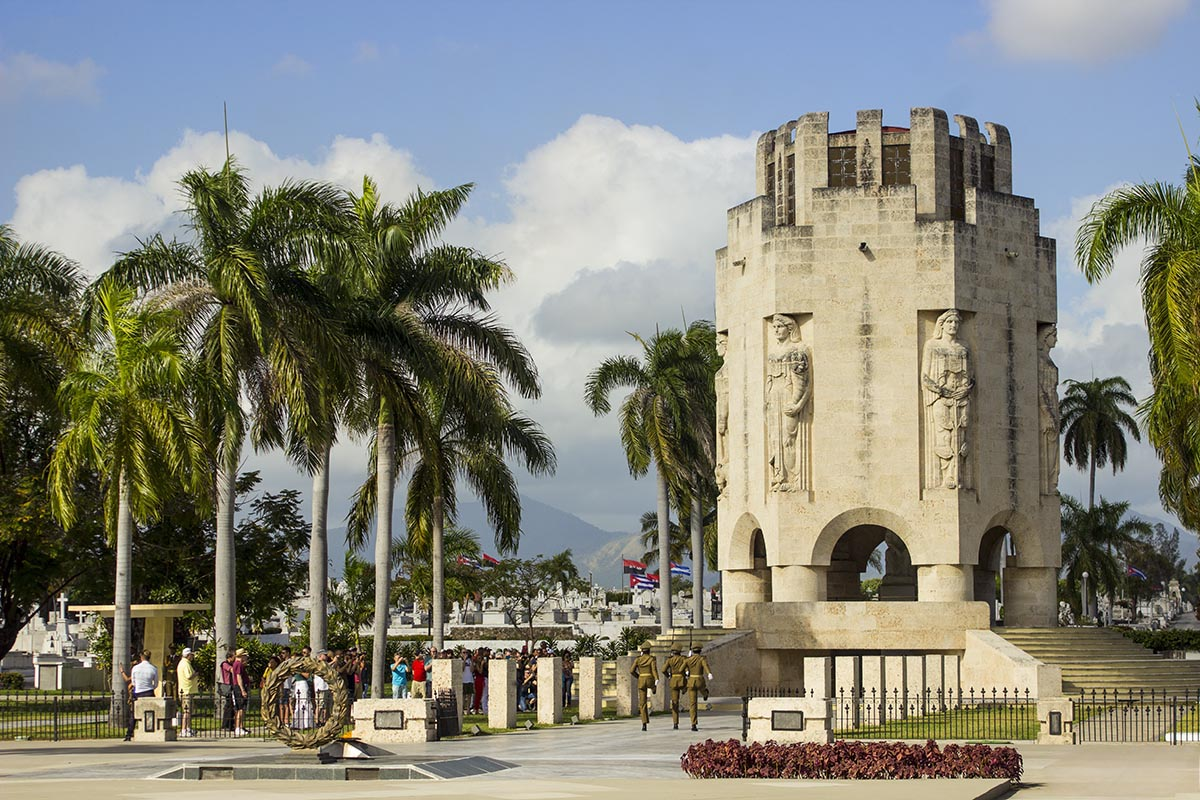
Mausoleum dedicated to the national hero José Martí.

Tomb of José Martí.

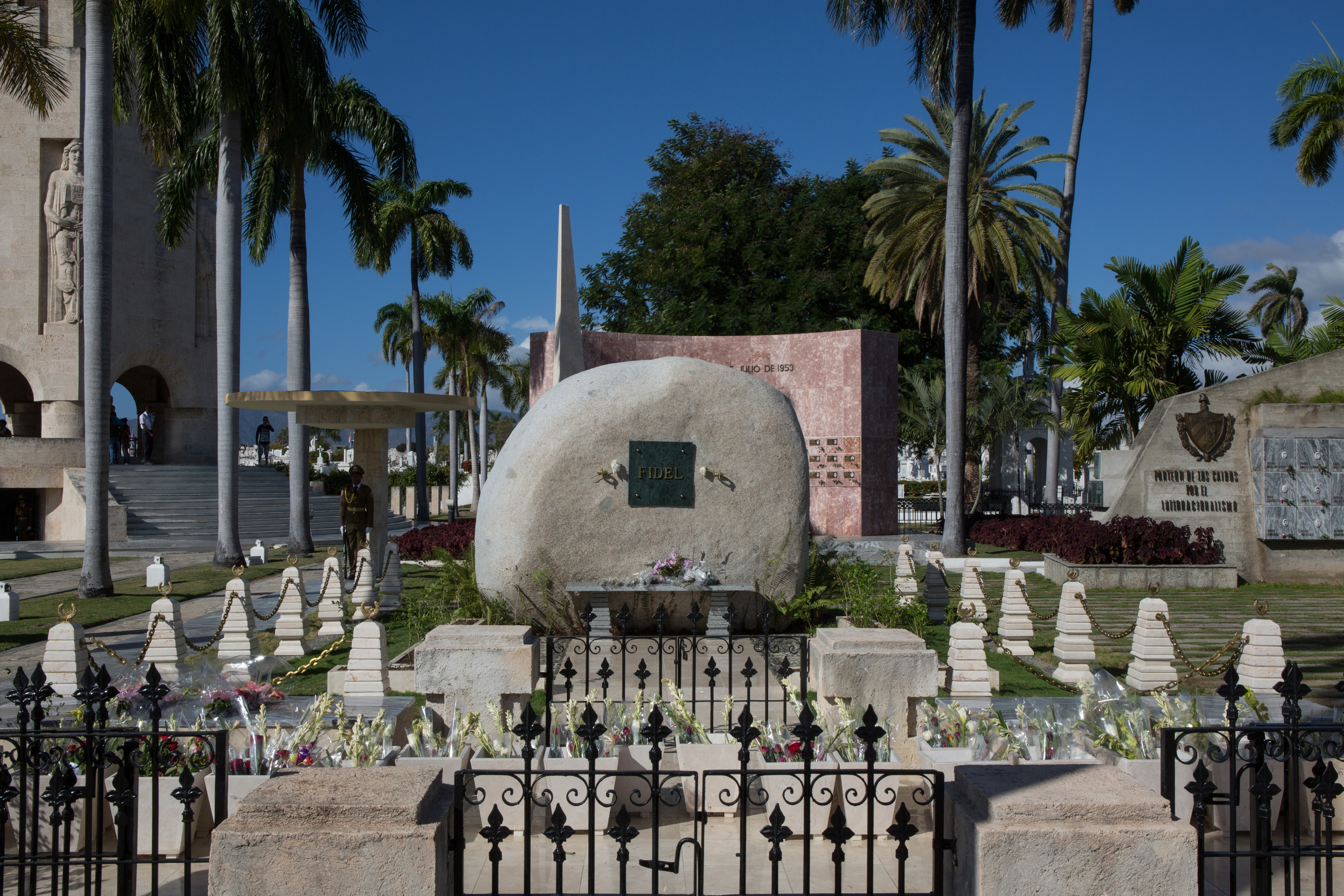
Tomb of Fidel Castro.

Tomb of Antonio Maceo's wife.

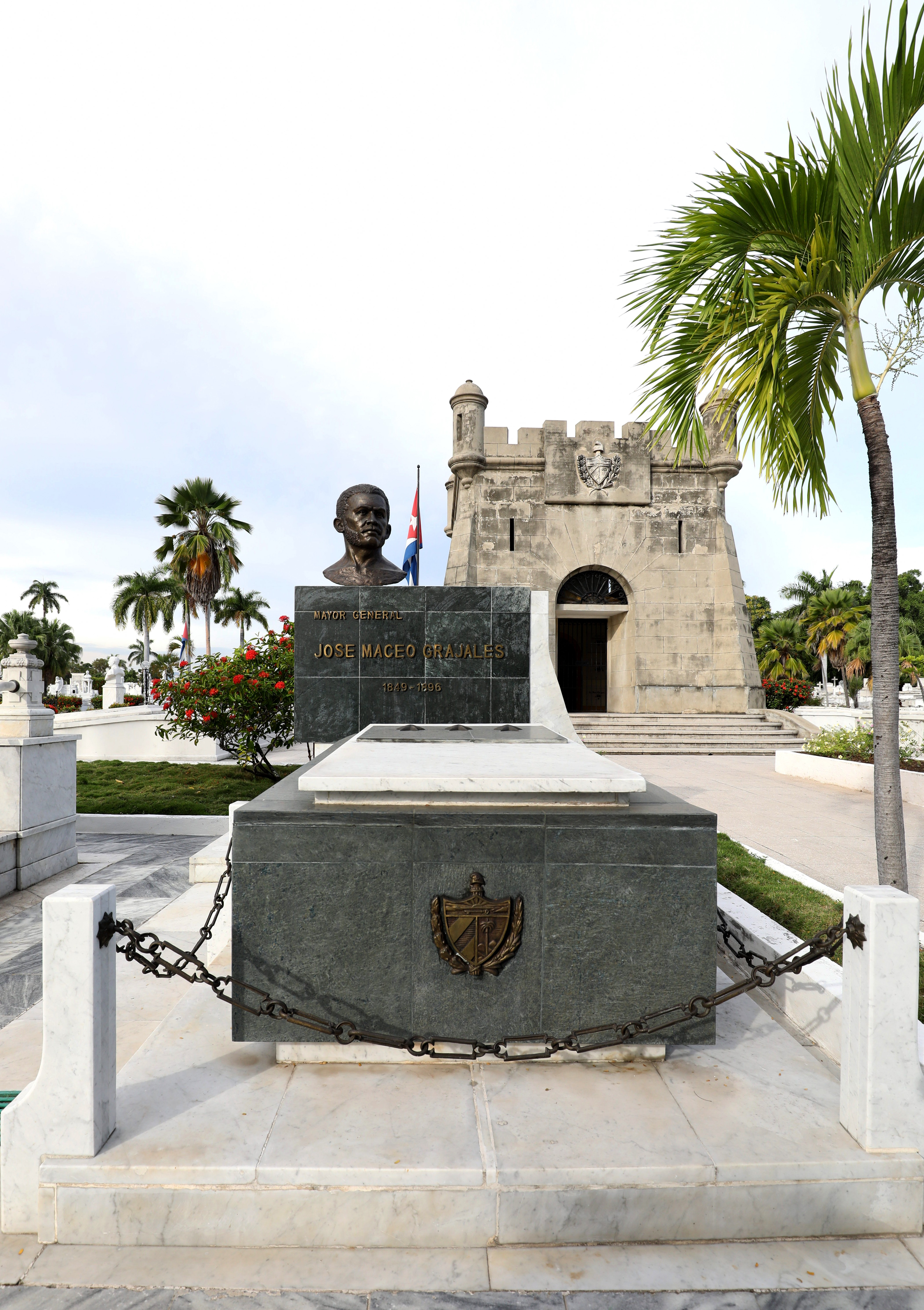
Tomb of José Maceo

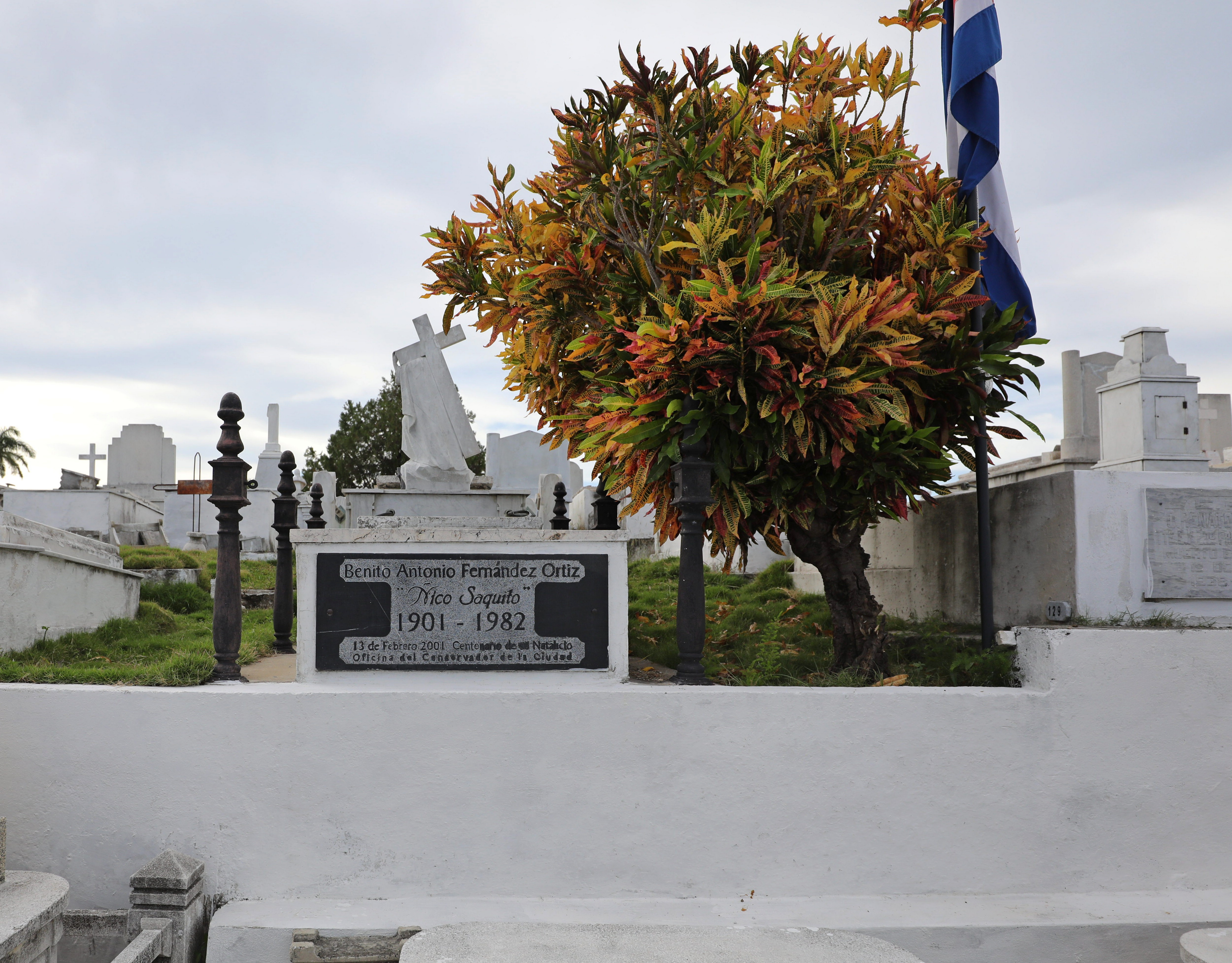
Tomb of Ñico Saquito

== See also ==
- Che Guevara Mausoleum
- Lenin's Mausoleum
- Kremlin Wall Necropolis
- Ho Chi Minh Mausoleum
- El Museo Histórico Militar de Caracas
- National Pantheon of Venezuela
