= Chico Rei =

Semi-mythic heroic Brazilian slave

Chico Rei is a semi-mythic heroic figure from the slave trade in Brazil.

According to oral tradition, in about 1740, Galanga, a monarch from the Kingdom of Kongo was taken along with a large part of his tribe and sold as a slave. They were brought from Africa to Brazil in a slave ship and during this journey his authority amongst his compatriots was noticed by the Portuguese slave traders who nicknamed him "Chico Rei". In Brazil he was set to work in the gold mines of Minas Gerais. By hiding flakes of gold about his body and in his hair, he amassed sufficient funds to allow him, after 5 years or so, to buy his son's freedom and later his own. He was also able to acquire the Encardideira gold mine in Vila Rica (now Ouro Preto). Profits from the mine were used to help other slaves to buy their freedom and to build the church of Santa Efigênia, also in Vila Rica. The Encardideira mine has been disused since 1888 when slavery was abolished in Brazil and it is now open to the public.

The legend of Chico Rei has become part of the Brazilian folklore and his tale of fighting for freedom has captured the imagination of many Brazilian storytellers. His story is often told in Brazilian folklore tales books, and it has been told both in theater and cinema as well.
