= Mariana Grajales Women's Platoon =

Mariana Grajales Women’s Platoon
- El pelotón Mariana Grajales
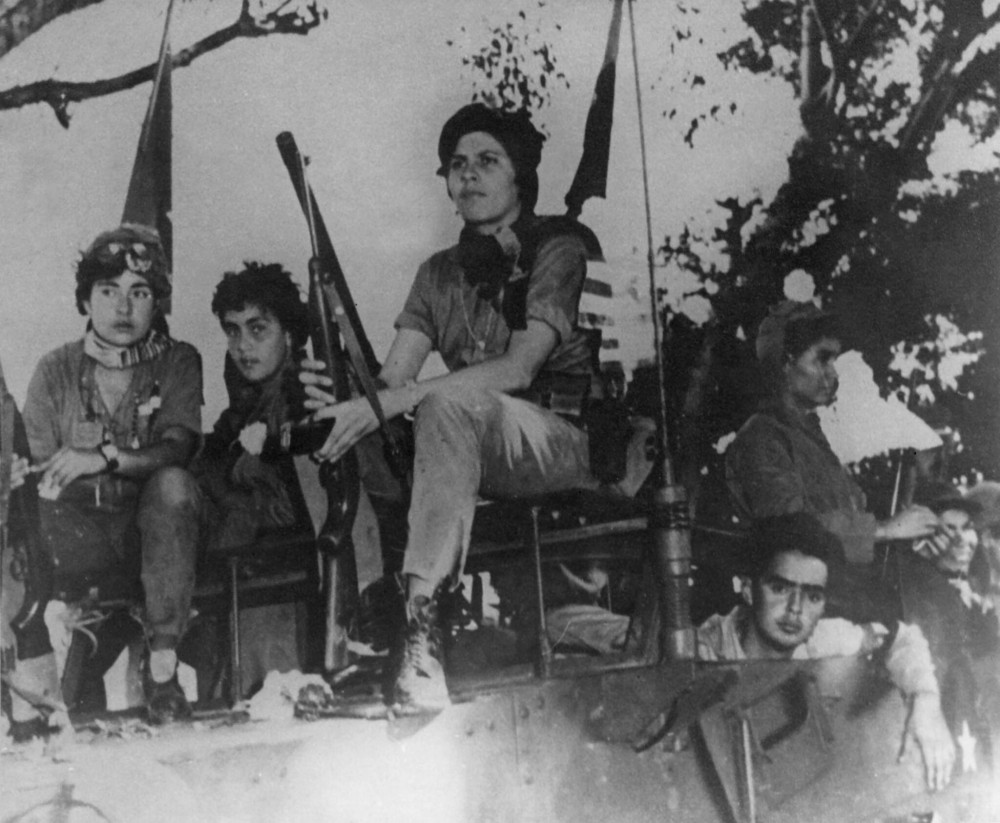
- Active: 4 September 1958 - 1 January 1959
- Disbanded: 1 January 1959
- Country: Cuba
- Allegiance: 26th of July Movement
- Size: 13 or 14
- Nickname: Las Marianas
- Engagements: Battle of Cerro Pelado, Battle of Guisa

Commanders
- Notable commanders: Isabel Rielo, Teté Puebla

The Mariana Grajales Women's Platoon (Spanish: El pelotón Mariana Grajales), or Las Marianas, was an all-female military platoon created by Fidel Castro, Celia Sánchez, and Haydée Santamaría during the 26th of July Movement on 4 September 1958, named after the Cuban icon Mariana Grajales Cuello who served in the Cuban War of Independence.

== History ==
After a group of women led by Isabel Rielo pleaded with Fidel Castro to create a women's unit, Castro summoned the leaders of the rebel army for a debate on 3 September 1958. After seven hours of discussion, at about 1 a.m. Castro authorized the creation of the platoon. Isabel Rielo was selected to lead the platoon as the result of a shooting test.

It is estimated by several accounts that women only made up about 5% of the total rebel forces during the Cuban Revolution. So the Mariana Grajales Platoon, which was composed of 13 young women, was a unique component of the revolutionary army. The platoon was essential in the rebels' 28 September 1958 victory over the Batista forces at Cerro Pelado (near modern-day Bartolomé Masó) after a three-day battle.

Members of the platoon used M1 carbines as their weapon of choice.

Following victory in January 1959, the members of the platoon worked to build schools in the mountainous portion of eastern Cuba.

On 4 September 1988, the 30th anniversary of the founding of the platoon, a commemorative event was held at the headquarters of the Women's Anti-Air Artillery Regiment. In attendance were Vilma Espín, president of the Federation of Cuban Women, Nguyễn Thị Định, then-Vice President of Vietnam and member of the Central Committee of the Communist Party of Vietnam, and Corps General Julio Casas Regueiro of the Revolutionary Armed Forces.

== Members ==
- Haydée Santamaría
- Isabel Rielo Rodríguez (commanding officer)
- Teté Puebla (second-in-command)
- Olga Guevara Pérez
- Eva Palma Rodríguez
- Lilia Rielo Rodríguez
- Rita García Reyes
- Angelina Antolín Escalona
- Edemis Tamayo Núñez
- Norma Ferrer Benítez
- Flor Pérez Chávez
- Juana Peña Peña
- Orosia Soto Sardiña
- Ada Bella Acosta Pompa

== See also ==
- Dickey Chapelle, an American photojournalist who reported on the Cuban Revolution and observed the platoon from the rebels' side
- Federation of Cuban Women
