= Emilio Bacardi =

Cuban industrialist, politician and writer

Emilio Bacardí
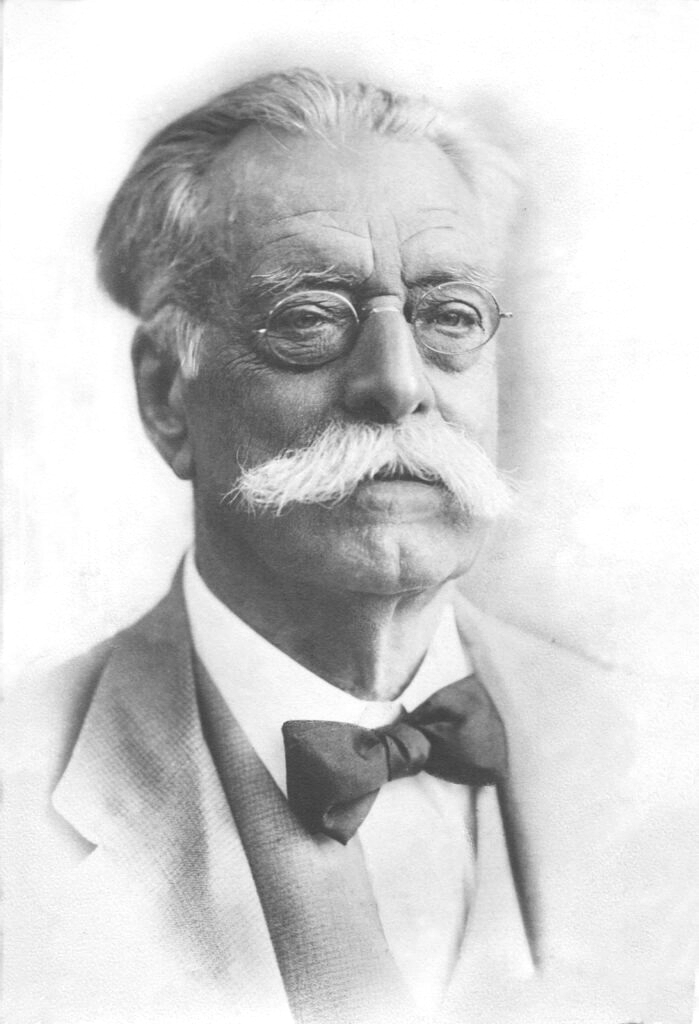
- Born: Emilio Bacardí y Moreau; June 5, 1844; Santiago de Cuba, Captaincy General of Cuba, Spanish Empire
- Died: August 28, 1922 (aged 78); Santiago de Cuba, Cuba
- Burial place: Santa Ifigenia Cemetery
- Family: Facundo Bacardí (father); Lucia 'Amalia' Victoria Moreau (mother)

Emilio Bacardí y Moreau (1844–1922) was a Cuban industrialist, politician, and writer who managed the Bacardi Rum Company and served as the first democratically elected mayor of Santiago.

== Biography ==
Emilio Bacardí y Moreau was born in Santiago de Cuba, Spanish Cuba on June 5, 1844. Emilio was the son of Don Facundo Bacardí Massó and his wife Lucía 'Amalia' Victoria Moreau, a woman from a very prosperous family of Franco-Haitian descent. His father was a businessman who in 1862 founded the Bacardi rum company that would grow into today's international corporation, Bacardi Limited. However, before finding stability in the rum business, Facundo and his young family experienced hardships in Cuba. For instance, in 1852 a major earthquake struck Santiago and the family briefly returned to Don Facundo's homeland of Spain to escape the ensuing epidemics of cholera (epidemics which claimed some of Emilio's siblings). Upon his return to Santiago de Cuba, Facundo found that his general store was looted and its customers were unable to pay him. Within a few years he was bankrupt.

In some ways, Emilio was protected from the turbulence by distance: the family's return to Cuba was completed without him, as Emilio stayed behind with a family friend in Spain. He received instruction in literary and political topics and grew to appreciate the arts and the liberal politics of the day (including abolition of slavery, criticism of organized religion, nationalism, and democracy). By the time he returned to Cuba, his interests lay more in political and poetic activism than business. However, as the first-born son of his father, at the age of 17, he was given a growing and important role in the fledgling company.

Throughout the 1870s, 1880's, and 1890's, Emilio's dual identity as business magnate and subversive political activist grew. The rum business continued to grow under his leadership, which was made official in 1877 when Don Facundo retired and named him president of the company. At the same time, Emilio became more and more involved in Cuba's nationalistic resistance to the Spanish Empire. He was repeatedly arrested and imprisoned on suspicion of helping the rebels. These suspicions were well founded; while Emilio spent much of his time committed to the daily activities of the family business, he had also secretly developed a communication network among the rebel army, supplying resources to aid in the fight for independence.

Emilio's personal life continued to develop as well: in 1876 he married Maria Lay Berlucheau, a French Cuban from Santiago. He would go on to have a number of children with her, including Emilio (Emilito), Daniel, Jose, Facundo, Maria, and Carmen. In the spring of 1885, Maria Lay died at the age of 33, devastating Emilio and sending him into a depression from which it took months to recover. The following year Emilio's heartbreak worsened with the passing of family patriarch Don Facundo Bacardí Massó. His eventual recovery to both the Bacardi business and forefront of the fight for independence coincided with the companionship of Elvira Cape, whom he married in 1887 and lived with for the rest of his life. Their four children (Marina, Lucia (Mimin), Adelaida (Lalita), and Amalia) further enlarged the Bacardí family.

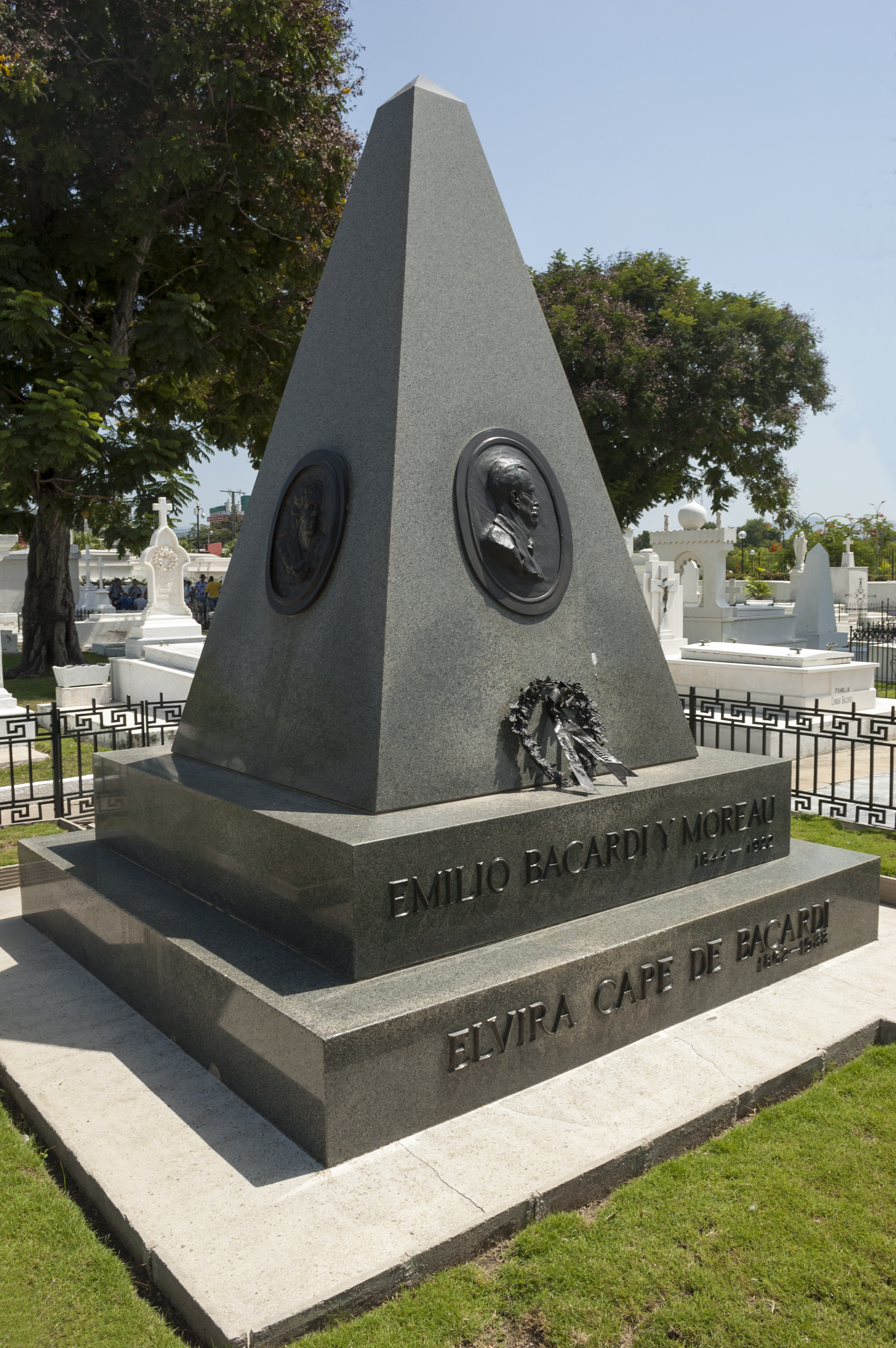
Burial vault of Emilio Bacardí y Moreau and his wife Elvira Cape de Bacardí, located in the Santa Ifigenia Cemetery, in the provinces Santiago de Cuba, Cuba.

In 1899, Emilio Barcardí founded the Emilio Bacardí Moreau Municipal Museum (Spanish: Museo Municipal Emilio Bacardí Moreau) in the city of Santiago de Cuba.

The political fortunes of both Cuba and Emilio were radically altered by the Spanish–American War, in which the conquering American army took over administration of the island. The American military governor of Santiago, General Leonard Wood, appointed Bacardí as mayor of Santiago. In this position, Emilio worked extensively with the American military administration, and the relationship between him and General Wood warmed to the level of friendship, tempered by their complicated political relationship. As mayor, he was generally recognized as a competent and effective manager, succeeding on extending services and practicing good government under the military administration and later the new Cuban republic. His reputation for honesty and public service distinguished him from many of the would-be leaders who arose in the post-independence political scramble, and he eventually ran for and won a seat in the national senate in 1906.

Into the 20th century, Emilio and the second generation of Bacardí family oversaw the expansion and eventual success of the Bacardí rum company. This led Emilio to spend more time in private ventures, and traveling the world. In 1912, Emilio and his wife Elvira took a long trip overseas to Paris, Jerusalem, and Egypt, bringing back antiquities, art, and Cuba's first genuine Cuban mummy to display in the Emilio Bacardí Moreau Municipal Museum in Santiago de Cuba. By the age of 75, Emilio had mostly retired from business affairs and spent much of his time reading, and writing novels like his famed series Cronicas de Santiago de Cuba, and corresponding with family in his home, Villa Elvira.

Emilio Bacardí Moreau died from a heart ailment on August 28, 1922, at the age of 78. The city of Santiago suspended all public events for two days, to mourn and honor the life of Emilio, nicknamed "Cuba's foremost son".
