= Museo Municipal Emilio Bacardí Moreau =

Museum in Santiago de Cuba, Cuba

Emilio Bacardí Moreau Municipal Museum
- Museo Municipal Emilio Bacardí Moreau
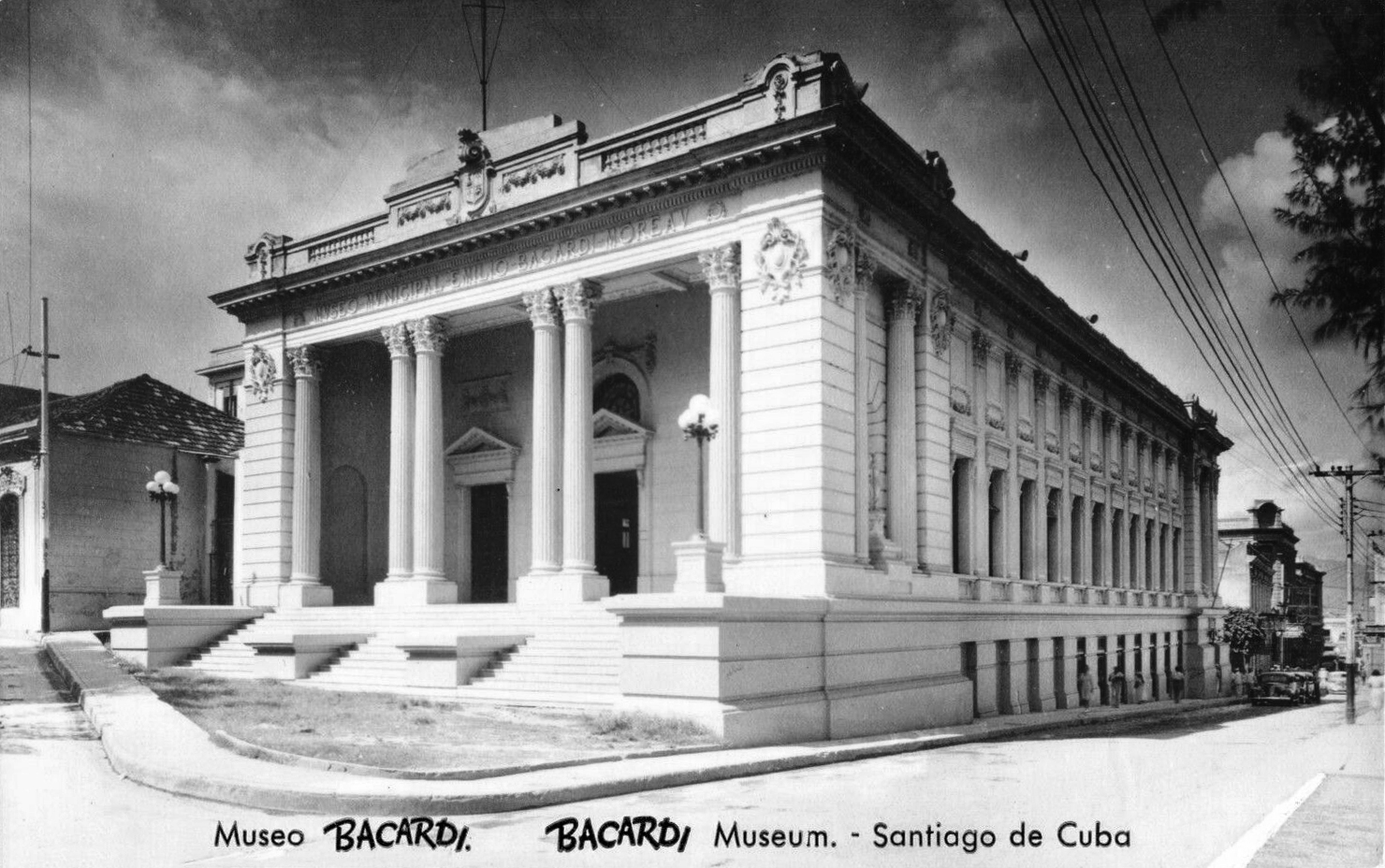
- Established: 1899
- Location: Santiago de Cuba
- Coordinates: 20°01′18″N 75°49′40″W
- Founder: Emilio Bacardi Moreau

The Emilio Bacardí Moreau Municipal Museum (Spanish: Museo Municipal Emilio Bacardí Moreau) is a museum in Santiago de Cuba, Cuba. Dating back to 1899, this museum is the oldest in Santiago de Cuba.

== History ==
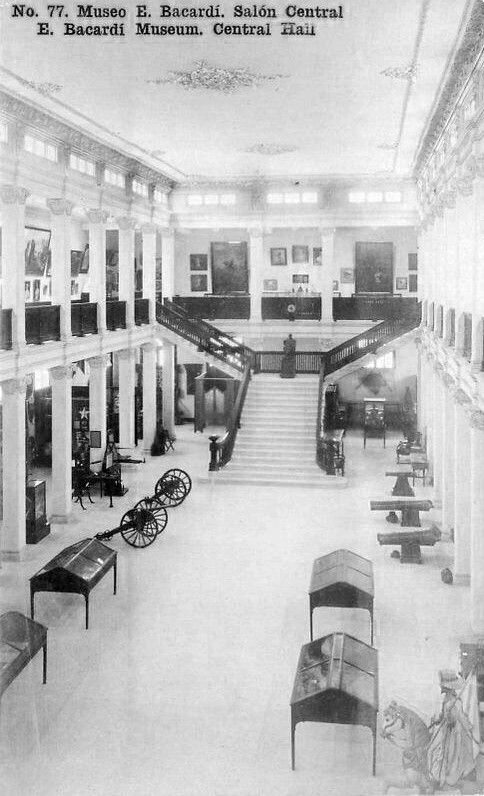
Museo E. Bacardi, Central Hall, Santiago de Cuba

It was established in 1899 by its founder and famous rum distiller Emilio Bacardi Moreau, in Santiago de Cuba. Situated on Calle Pío Rosada, between Calles Heredia and Aguilera, it is Santiago de Cuba's oldest museum.

Emilio Bacardí and his wife, Elvira Cape, embarked on a significant journey overseas in 1912. Their trip yielded an impressive collection of antiquities and art, as well as Cuba's first genuine mummy and sarcophagus from Egypt. These items would later be displayed. Additional exhibits in the museum included three death masks of Napoleon, a significant collection of artifacts from Cuba's wars of independence, art pieces deaccessioned from the Museo del Prado, and important works representing the French modernist era.

== Gallery ==
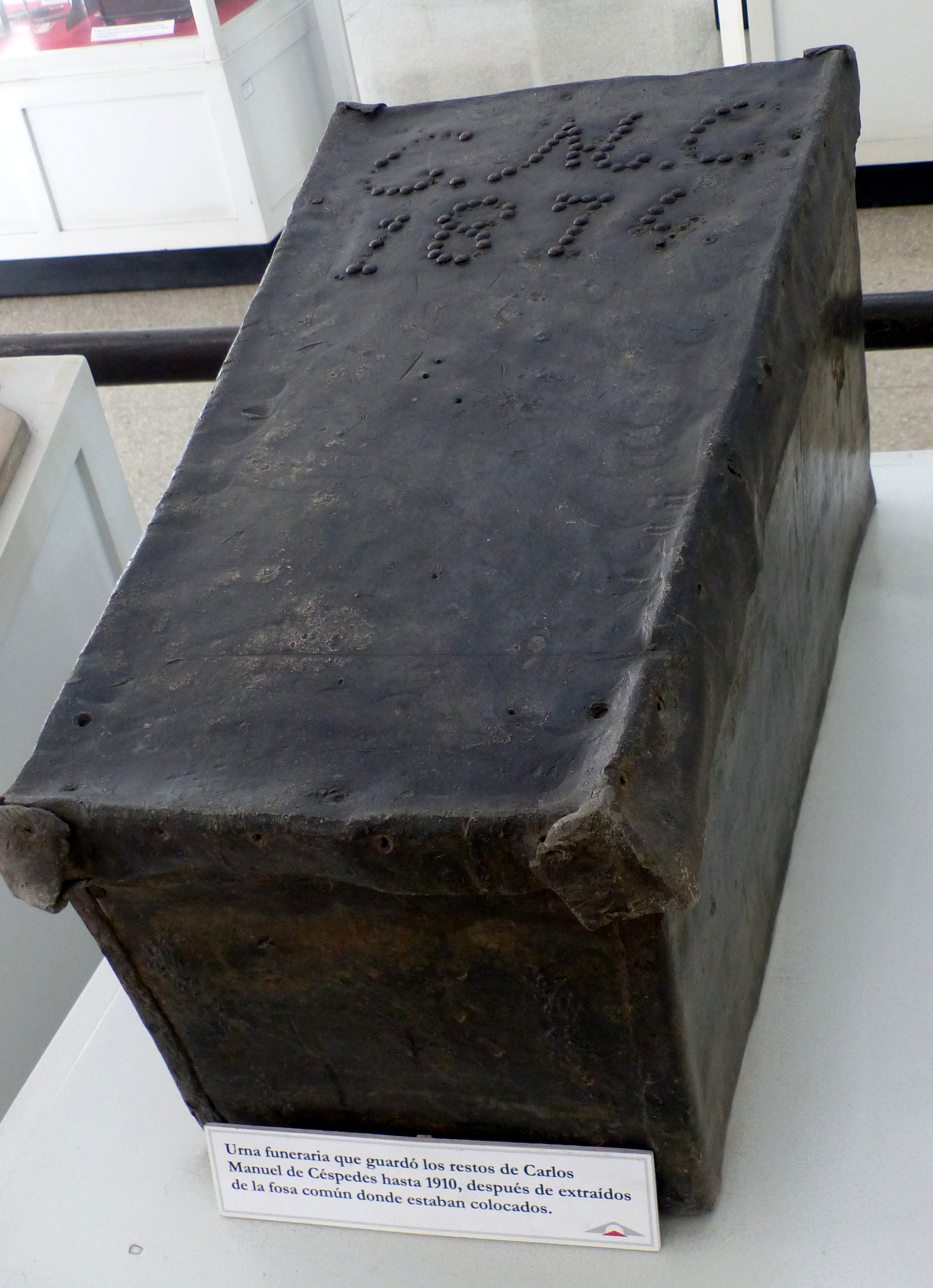

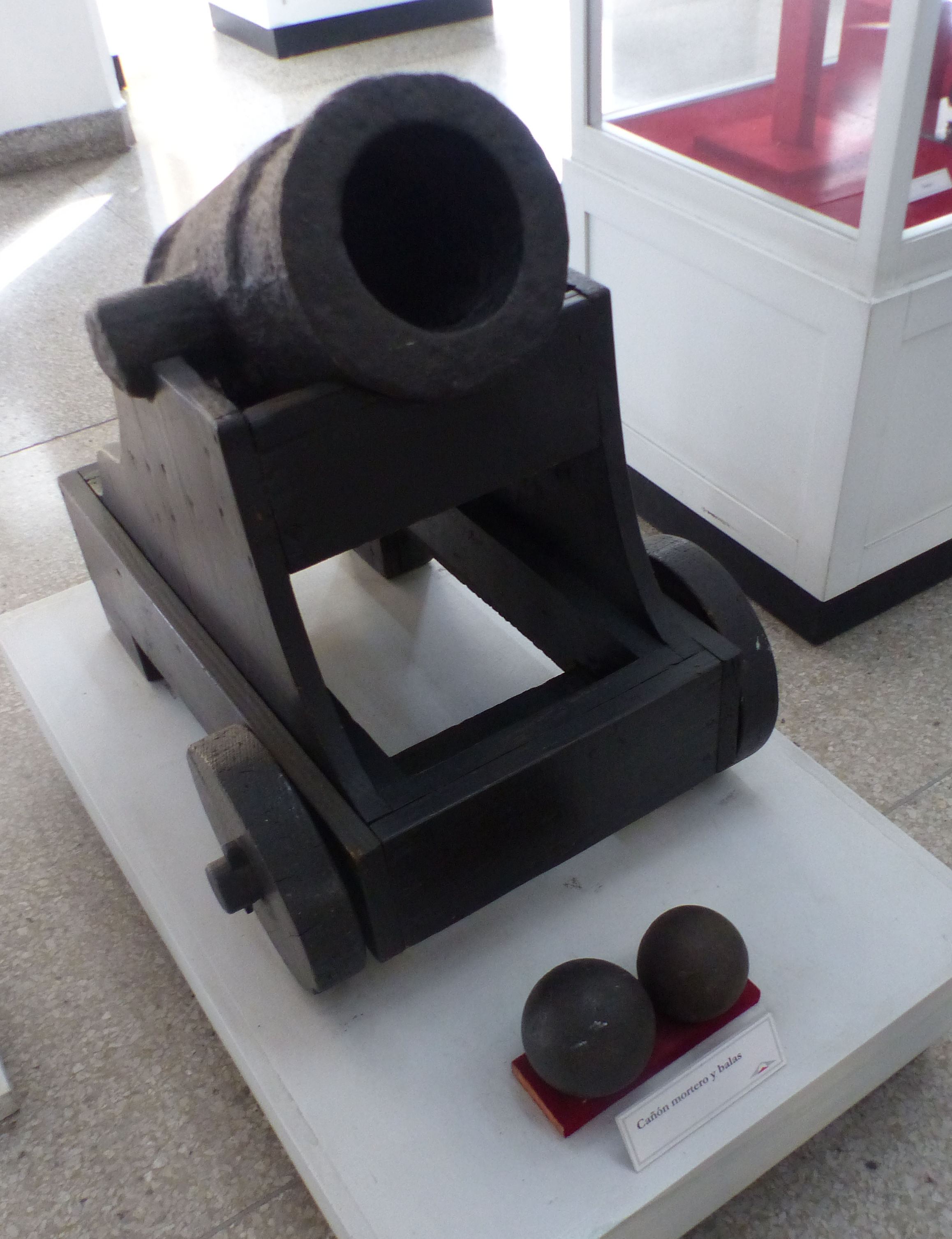

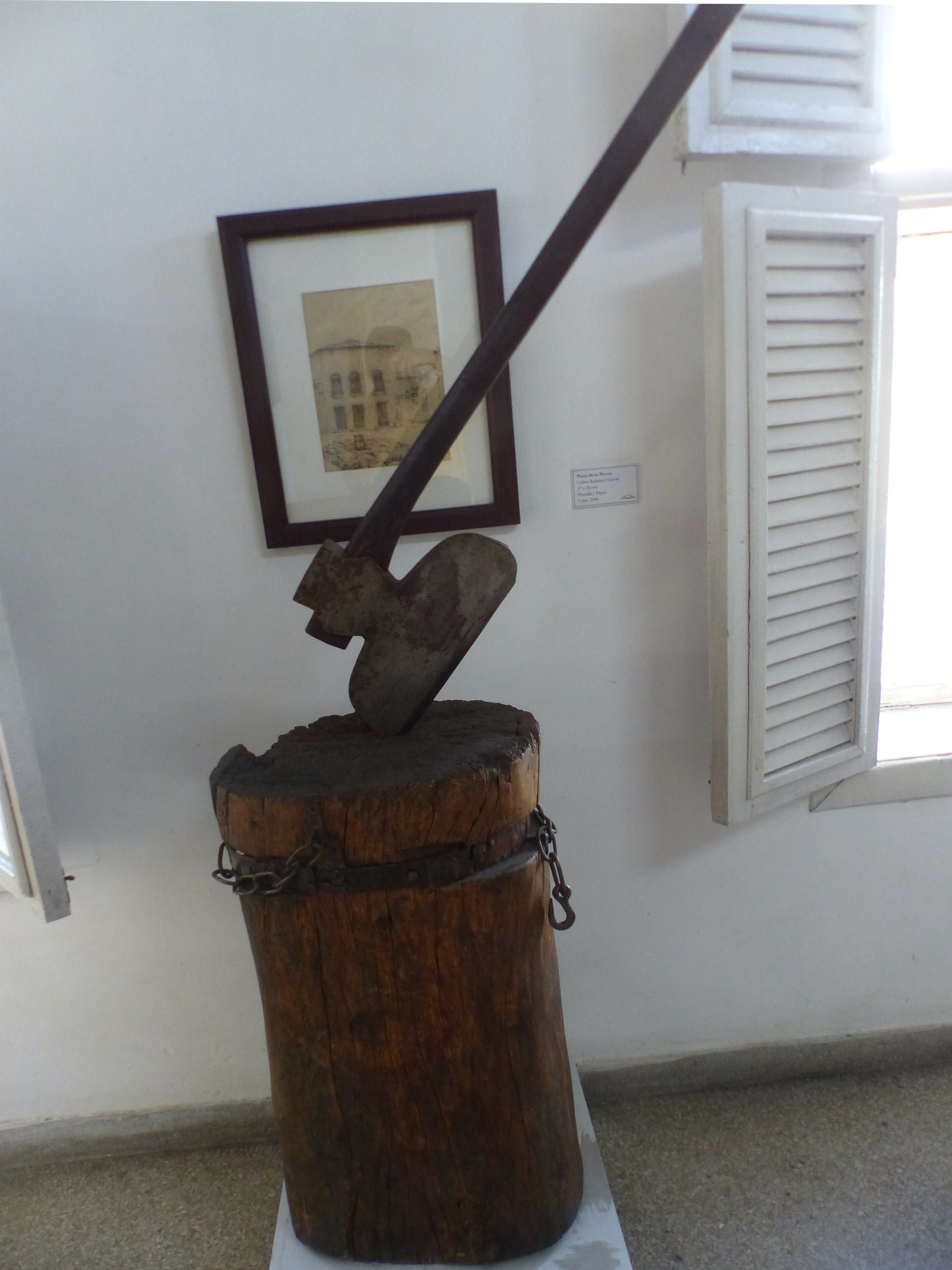

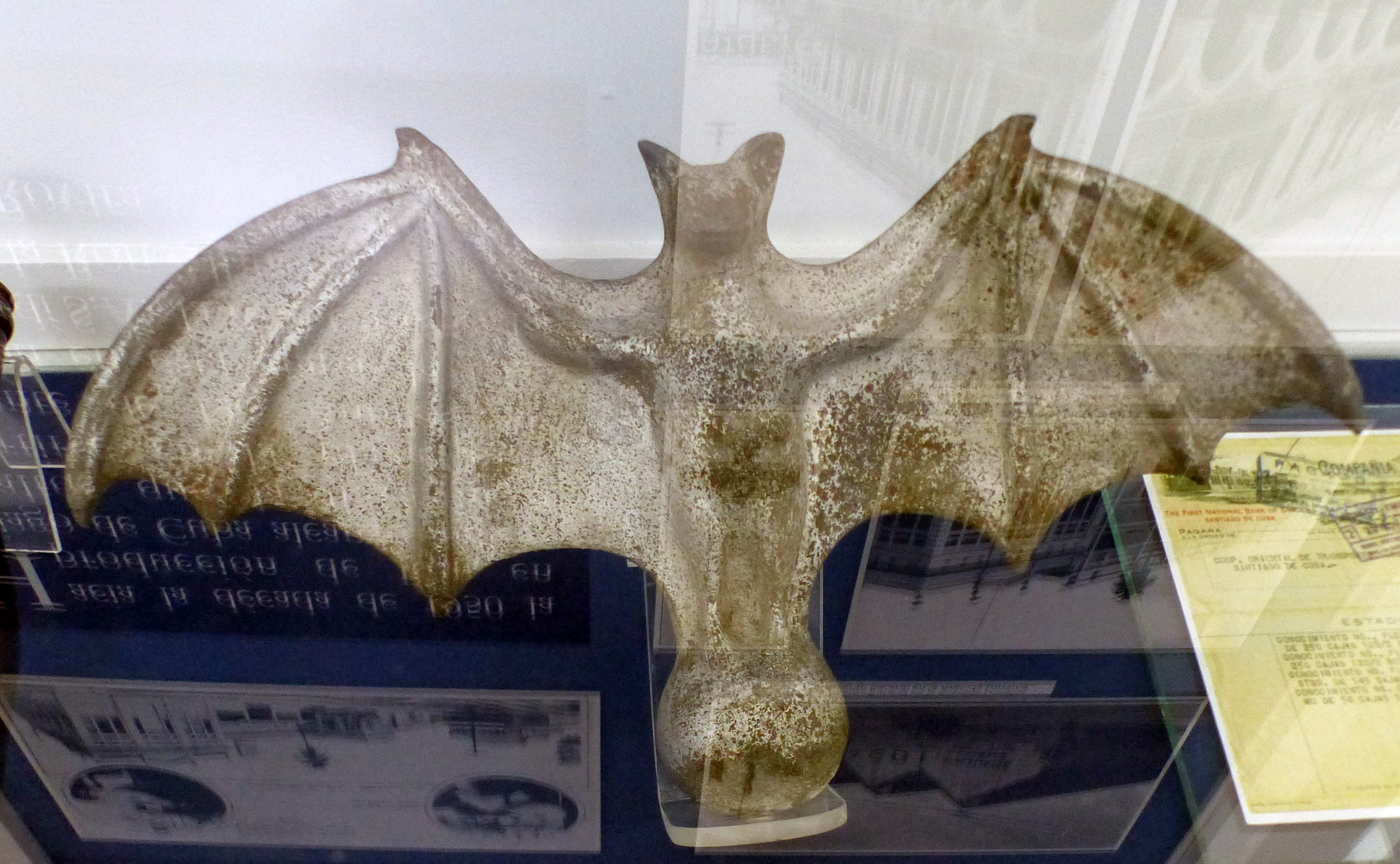

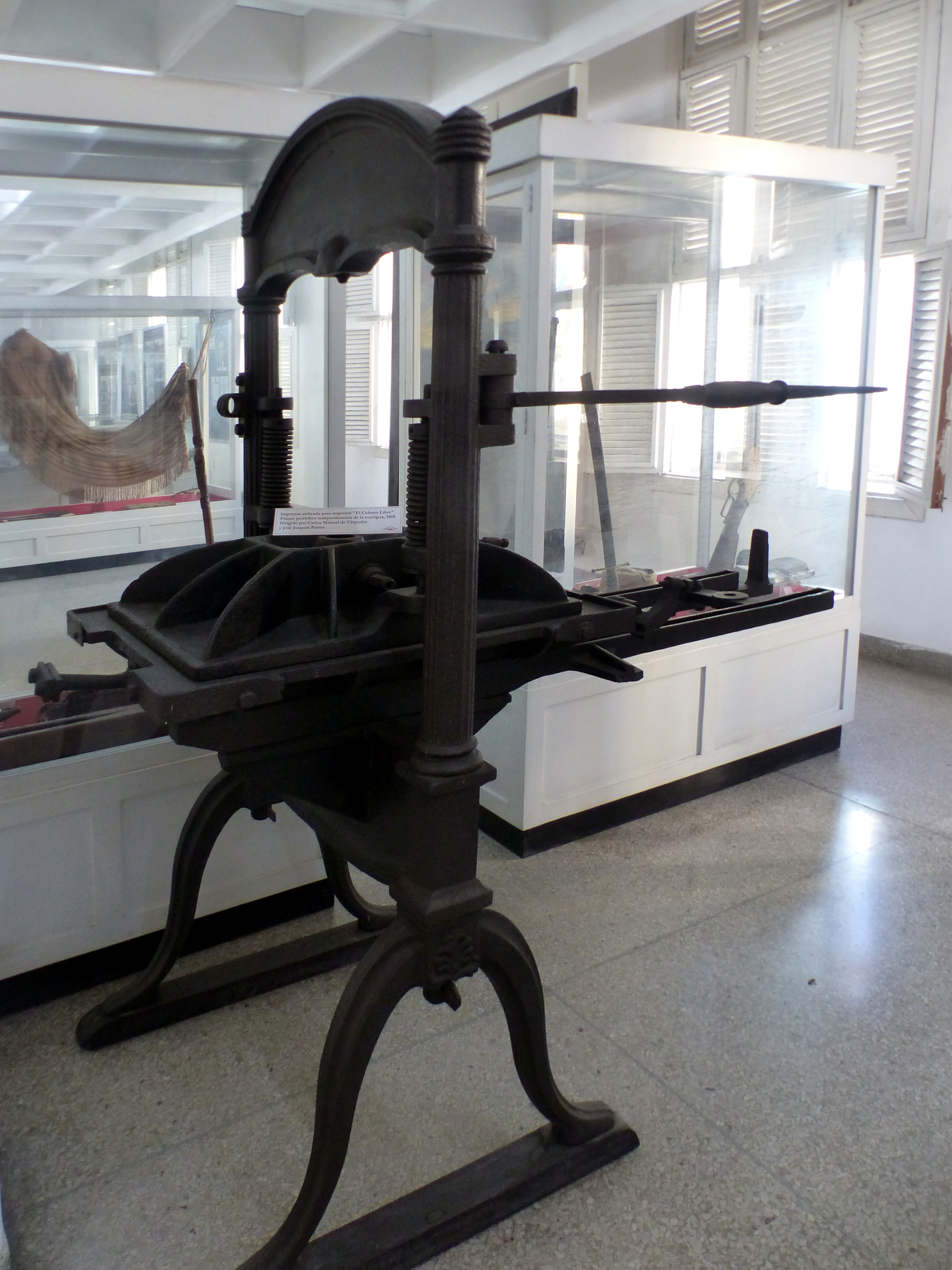

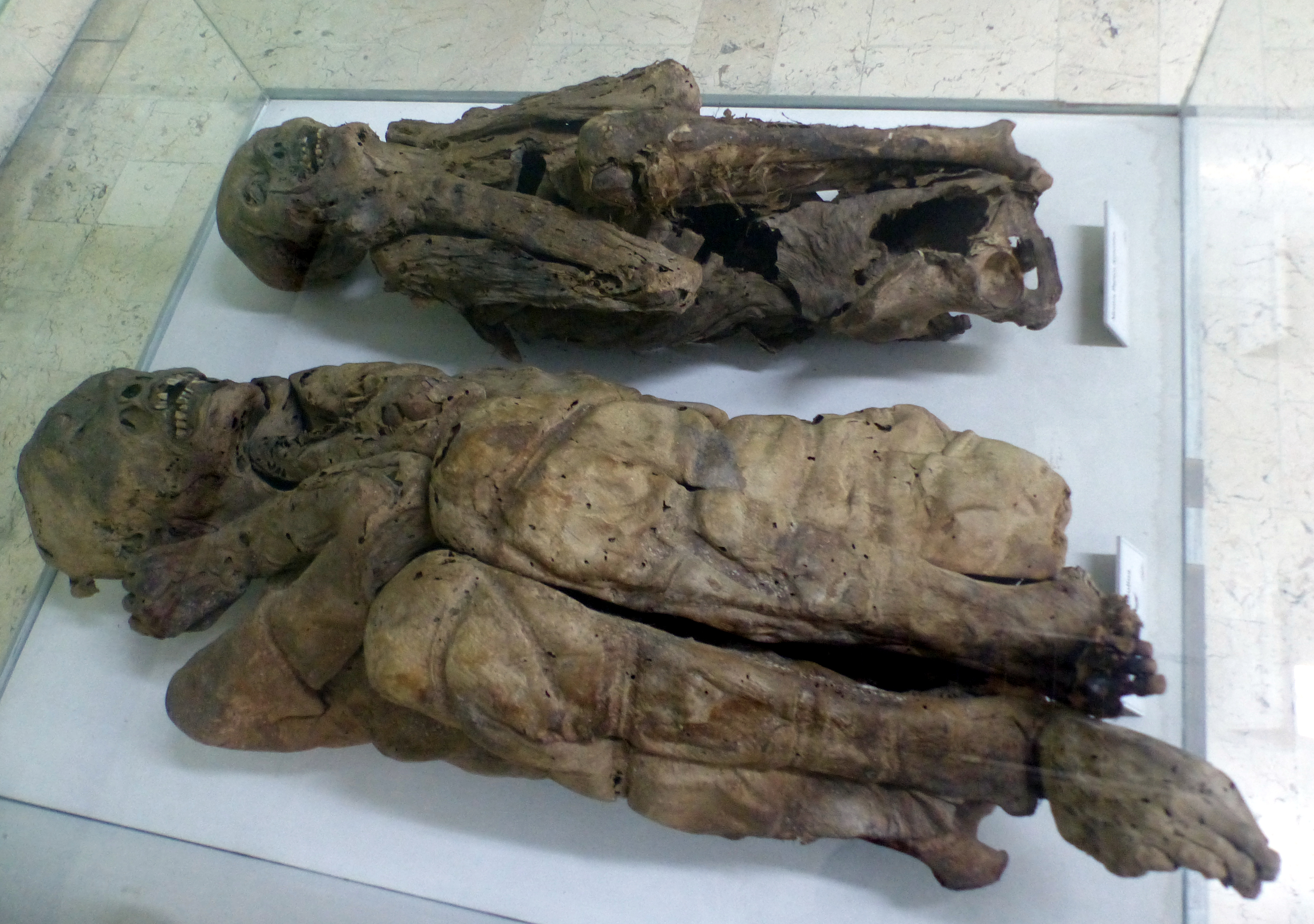

== See also ==
- List of museums in Cuba
