= María Cabrales =

Cuban activist, revolutionary and nurse (1842–1905)

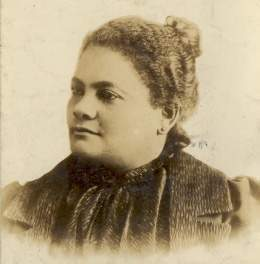
- Born: 20 March 1842; San Agustín, San Luis, Santiago de Cuba, Spanish Cuba
- Died: 28 July 1905 (aged 63); Santiago de Cuba, Cuba
- Burial place: Santa Ifigenia Cemetery, Santiago de Cuba, Cuba
- Occupations: Independence activist, revolutionary and nurse
- Movement: Cuban independence: Ten Years' War; Cuban War of Independence
- Spouse: Antonio Maceo (m. 1866, died 1896)
- Children: 2 (disputed)
- Relatives: Mariana Grajales Cuello (mother-in-law); José Maceo (brother-in-law)

María Magdalena Cabrales Fernández (20 March 1842 – 28 July 1905) was a Cuban independence activist, revolutionary and nurse.

== Biography ==
Cabrales was born 20 March 1842 on her family farm in San Agustín, San Luis, Santiago de Cuba, Spanish Cuba. Her family were free small landowners of African descent. She was the youngest daughter of her parents Ramón Cabrales and Antonia Fernández and had four elder siblings, Fabián, Santiago, Caridad and Dolores. Little is known about her education, but Cabrales was literate, which was uncommon for a woman of her status in Cuban society at the time.

Cabrales married Antonio Maceo on 16 February 1866 and they lived together on the La Esperanza Estate. They both supported Cuban independence. Some historians have claimed that she had two children who died in infancy, while others have said that there is no evidence that Cabrales and her husband had children.

During the Ten Years War (1868–1878) against the Spanish rule of Cuba, Cabrales joined the insurrection and lived in the forests with independence fighters. Her husband became Major General of the Cuban Liberation Army and Cabrales came to "symbolize the revolutionary compañera (companion)." She worked as a nurse in field hospitals and treated wounded patriot soldiers, using knowledge of medicinal herbs, alongside her mother-in-law Mariana Grajales Cuello and Bernanda Toro [es]. José Martí, after witnessing Grajales and Cabrales enter the battlefield to rescue wounded Antonio with only cover fire from his brother José Maceo, said: "Fáciles son los heroes con tales mujeres" (It is easy to be heroes with women such as these). Cabrales also provided provisions for soldiers.

Cabrales rejected the Pact of Zanjón and seconded the Baragua Protest [es]. In 1889, Cabrales and her husband were expelled from Cuba.

Cabrales went into exile with her husband and they lived among the Cuban émigré communities in Costa Rica, Honduras, Jamaica and the United States (New Orleans and Key West). While living in Jamaica, she and her husband survived by cultivating a tobacco and fruit plantation. While living in Costa Rica, Cabrales founded the El Club de las Mujeres Cubanas de Costa Rica (The Cuban Women's Club of Costa Rica) to help raise funds for independence movement in Cuba.

Her husband returned to Cuba and died in combat in 1896 at Punta Brava. After her husband's death, Cabrales retired to San Agustin. She was financially supported in her widowhood by a monthly pension of two pesos in gold, which was awarded to her by Cienfuegos municipal councillors. Politically, she was disappointed that Cubans of African descent became politically marginalised in the late 1890s.

Cabrales died on 28 July 1905 in Santiago de Cuba, aged 63. She is buried in the Santa Ifigenia Cemetery, Santiago de Cuba.
