= Santa Luzia, Bahia =

Santa Luzia
- Municipality
- Location in Brazil
- Coordinates: 15°25′44″S 39°20′2″W
- Country: Brazil
- Region: Nordeste
- State: Bahia

Population (2020)
  - Total: 12,449
- Time zone: UTC−3 (BRT)

Santa Luzia is a municipality in the state of Bahia in the North-East region of Brazil.

== See also ==
- List of municipalities in Bahia
