= Santa Efigenia =

- Location within Honduras
- Coordinates: 14°29′N 89°1′W
- Country: Honduras
- Department: Ocotepeque (department)

Santa Efigenia is a town in the Honduran department of Ocotepeque (department).
