= Facundo Bacardi =

Catalan businessman

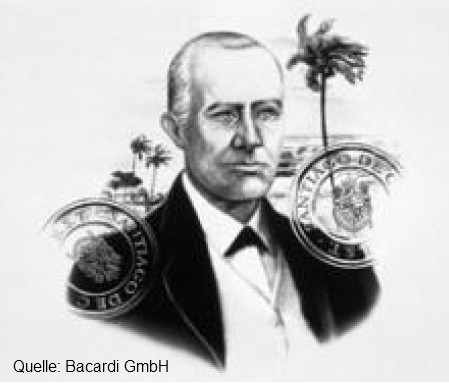
- Facundo Bacardí
- Born: 13 October 1813; Sitges, Barcelona, Catalonia, Spain
- Died: 9 May 1886 (aged 71); Santiago de Cuba, Spanish Cuba
- Family: Emilio Bacardi (son), Lucia 'Amalia' Victoria Moreau (wife)

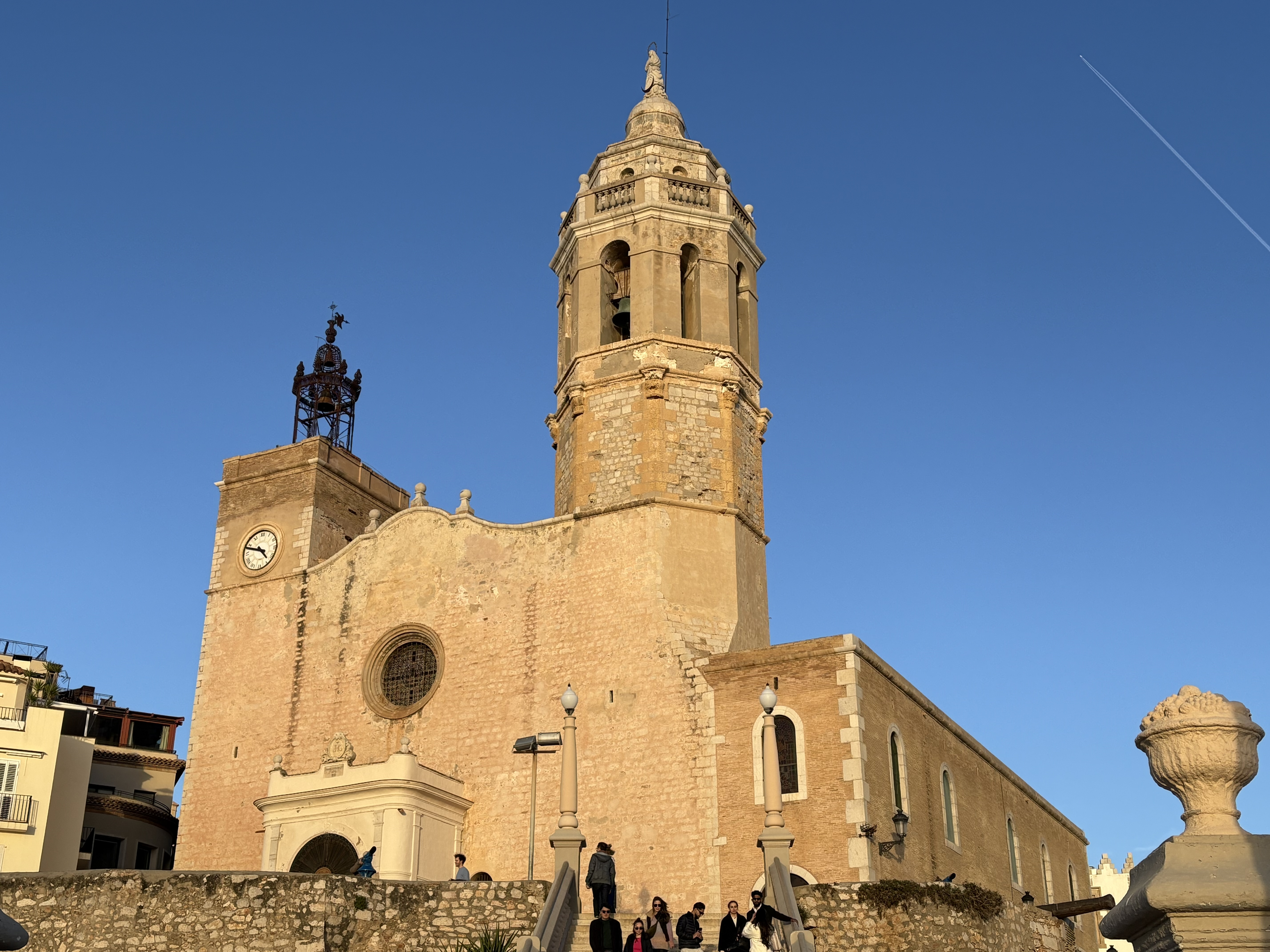
Church of Saint Bartholomew and Saint Thecla (Sitges), where Facundo Bacardí was baptised on October 14, 1813.

Don Facundo Bacardí Masó (Catalan: Facund Bacardí i Massó, IPA: [fəˈkund bəkəɾˈðij məˈso]; 13 October 1813 – 9 May 1886) was a Spanish businessman who, in 1862, founded the eponymous Bacardi rum distillery.

== Biography ==
Bacardí was born in Sitges (Garraf, Catalonia, Spain), son of a bricklayer. In 1828, he followed his older brothers to Cuba, finding employment in their general store in Santiago. In 1843 he established his own mercantile shop in Santiago, three months after marrying Lucia 'Amalia' Victoria Moreau, a woman from a very prosperous family of Franco-Haitian descent.

Amalia and her family would come to the financial aid of Facundo repeatedly throughout the course of their business ventures. Facundo and Amalia had a number of children, many of whom would play important parts in building the rum business for which the family became famous: Emilio was born in 1844, Juan in 1846, Facundo Jr. in 1848, María in 1851, José in 1857, and Amalia Jr. in 1861.

A 7.0 magnitude earthquake followed by a cholera epidemic devastated Santiago in 1852, claiming the lives of Juan and María. In efforts to safeguard the lives of their children, Facundo and Amalia decided to take the family to Catalonia to stay with Facundo's parents for a number of months. Upon his return to Santiago later that year, Facundo found his store looted and business conditions poor in the wake of the disaster and amid a global slump in sugar, the mainstay of the economy. Facundo's business Facundo Bacardí y Compañía wasn't able to recover, and it was bankrupt in 1855.

Soon after, Facundo, who noticed a gap in the spirits market for a premium Cuban rum, began to experiment with the process of distilling rum. Previously, rum was a crude, low quality beverage. Facundo, with the help of a French Cuban named José León Boutellier, a tenant of a building in Santiago owned by Doña Amalia's godmother Clara Astie, began to experiment with methods of distillation. A combination of revolutionary rum making methods utilizing a proprietary single yeast strain, a parallel distillation process, charcoal filtration, and white oak barrel aging resulted in a much more refined, tamer drink (now known as BACARDÍ rum) which they successfully sold through Facundo's brother's general store.

On 4 February 1862, the partners purchased a distillery on the outskirts of Santiago and constituted the firm "Bacardí, Boutellier, and Company", using capital supplied by Facundo's younger brother José. After owning a general retail business in Cuba for many years, Facundo Bacardí understood how to sell things, and realized that his innovative rum would benefit from good branding. He began to sign each shipment of rum with a bold "Bacardí M" (for Bacardi Massó); in addition, his wife Amalia suggested the adoption of the bat as a logo after spotting a colony of fruit bats hanging in the distillery rafters, a sign of family unity, good fortune and health to the Spanish and Cuban Taíno people.

In 1874, the firm was reorganized into "Bacardi and Company". Facundo's younger brother José chose to sell his shares, and his sons contributed some of their own capital and bought out most of Boutellier's stake as he declined in health. Bacardí rum grew in popularity as it was sold throughout Cuba and even the wider world after winning prizes in international exhibitions. In 1877, Facundo retired, turning management of the company over to his sons Emilio (president), Facundo Jr. (master blender), and José (sales).

The ensuing period of Cuban history was politically tumultuous, as a strong nationalist movement took shape, causing three wars of independence and dividing Cuban society. While Facundo was staunchly pro-Spanish, having been a member of a Volunteer Battalion in Santiago de Cuba in the 1850s, his sons were in favour of Cuban independence, a cause they openly defended after their father's death. However, Emilio became highly involved in politics and the fight for Cuban Independence while running the business and became suspected by the authorities. During one of many sweeps by the loyalist security services, Facundo himself and his son Emilio were arrested. Facundo was released but Emilio was eventually imprisoned for four years, during which the business was operated by the remaining brothers with Emilio providing strategic advice from afar.

Facundo lived to see Emilio released and the business to grow in fame, although not yet in financial strength. In March 1886, Don Facundo died at the age of 72. Despite creating a rum legacy passed down through generations of the Bacardí family, he left behind only a small house in Santiago de Cuba, a small family farm, and a company surviving on the verge of bankruptcy.
