= Mariana Grajales Cuello =

Icon of the Cuban war for independence against Spain

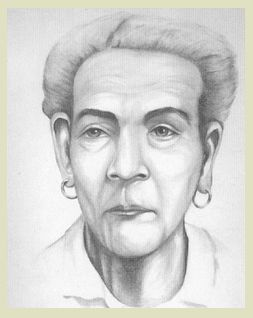
- Born: Mariana Grajales Cuello; July 12, 1815; Santiago de Cuba, Captaincy General of Cuba, Spanish Empire
- Died: November 28, 1893 (aged 78); Kingston, Jamaica

Mariana Grajales Cuello (July 12, 1815 – November 28, 1893) was a Cuban patriot and icon of the women's rights and the fight for Cuba's independence and abolition of slavery.

== Service to country ==
Mariana Grajales was born in Santiago de Cuba on July 12, 1815, to Teresa Cuello Zayas and José Grajales Matos, Dominican parents of mulato race. She married Marcos Maceo in 1851. She bore thirteen children, nine with Maceo, including Antonio Maceo Grajales, José Maceo, Rafael Maceo, Miguel Maceo, Julio Maceo, Tomás Maceo, Marcos Maceo Grajales, Dominga Maceo and Baldomera Maceo, giving birth to her last child at the age of 52. Mariana, along with her family, lived in the refuge of La Delicia in the barrio Majaguabo of San Luis, Santiago de Cuba, later running a mountain settlement and improvised bush hospital.

Mariana and her family served in the Ten Years' War, Little War (1868–78) and the War of 1895. José and Antonio Maceo Grajales, sons of Mariana, served as generals in the Liberation Army from 1868 through 1878. During her time serving in the war, Mariana ran hospitals and provision grounds on the base camps of her son Antonio, frequently entering the battlefield to aid wounded soldiers, both Spaniard and Cuban.

José Martí, after witnessing Mariana Grajales and Antonio Maceo's wife, Maria Cabrales, enter the battlefield to rescue the wounded Antonio, remarked: "Fáciles son los heroes con tales mujeres" (It is easy to be heroes with women such as these).

In 1878, after losing her husband, some of her sons, and her family estate in the Little War, Mariana went into exile in Jamaica for the safety of her remaining family. For the next 15 years, she continued to fight for Cuban independence from Spain by organizing groups of Cuban exiles in Jamaica. Mariana Grajales Cuello died on November 27, 1893, in Kingston, Jamaica at the age of 78. In 1923, her remains were returned to Cuba and interred at Santa Ifigenia Cemetery.

== Posthumous recognition ==
In 1957, the Mayor of Havana, Justo Luis Pozo del Puerto, officially declared Doña Mariana Grajales de Maceo the "Mother of Cuba". She has achieved iconic status in Cuba, similar to Nanny of the Maroons in Jamaica.

On September 4, 1958, Fidel Castro created the all-women platoon, titled the "Mariana Grajales Women's Squad." The platoon was armed with the lightweight M-1 carbines.

The Mariana Grajales Airport and Antonio Maceo Airport were dedicated to the memory of Mariana and her sons' contributions to the Cuban struggle.

== See also ==
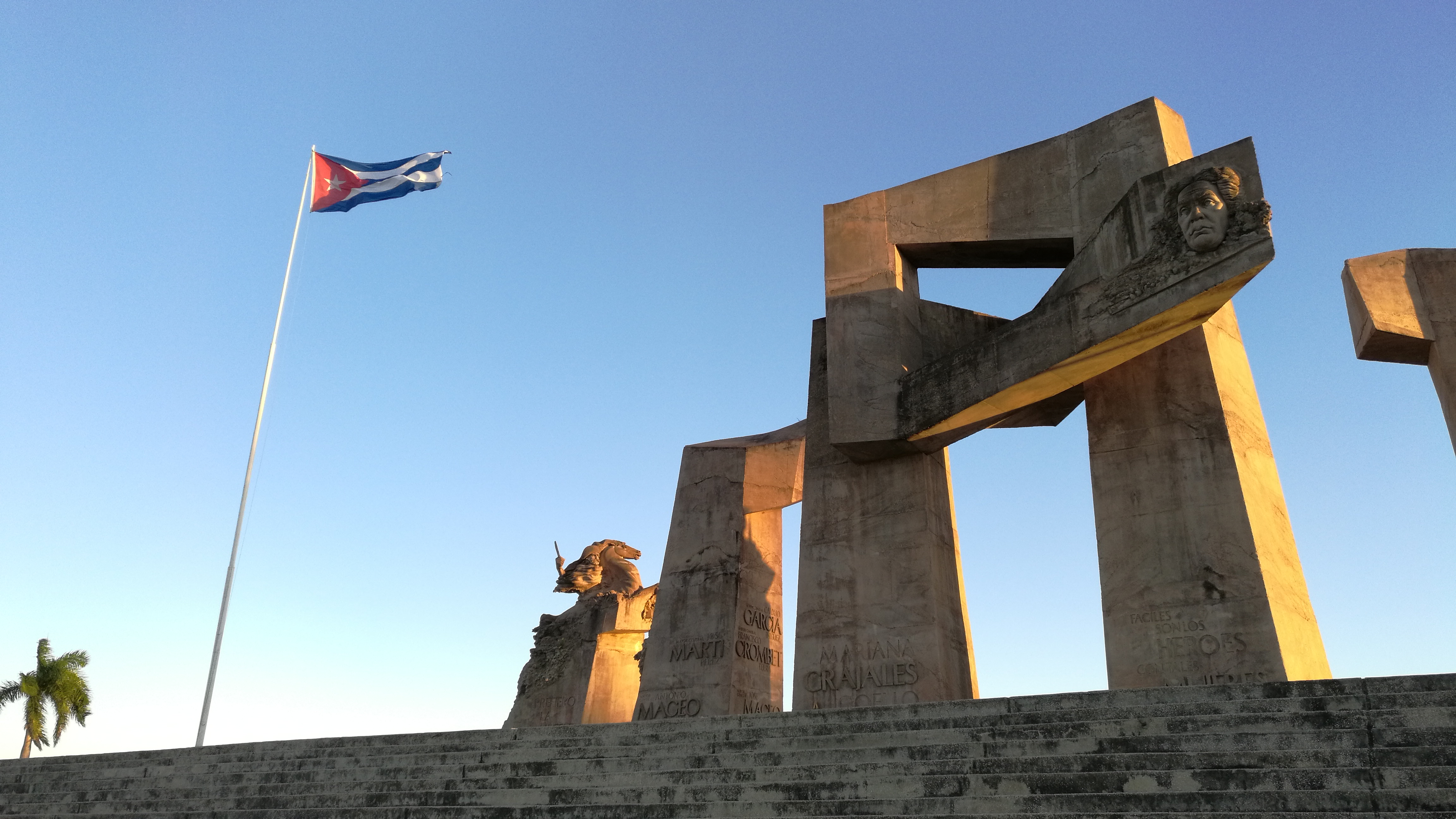
Memorial to Marcos Maceo and Mariana Grajales Cuello in Guantánamo, Cuba

- Cuban War of Independence
- Little War (1879)
- Suffrage
- Ten Years' War
