= Santa Efigênia de Minas =

Coordinates: 18.8269°S 42.4478°W

- Municipality
- Interactive map of Santa Efigênia de Minas
- Country: Brazil
- Region: Southeast
- State: Minas Gerais
- Mesoregion: Vale do Rio Doce

Population (2022 Census)
  - Total: 4,039
  - Estimate (2025): 4,038
- Time zone: UTC−3 (BRT)

Santa Efigênia de Minas is a municipality in the state of Minas Gerais in the Southeast region of Brazil.

== See also ==
- List of municipalities in Minas Gerais
