= Yuying School =

Yuying School may refer to:

- Yuying Secondary School, Singapore
- Beijing No. 25 Middle School, formerly Yuying School
- Yuying School, a predecessor of Zhejiang University
- Zhenze Middle School, Suzhou, China, formerly Yuying School
- The Second Yuying Foreign Languages School of Nanjing
