= Larry Allen (disambiguation) =

Larry Allen (1971–2024) was an American football player.

Larry Allen may also refer to:

- Laurence Edmund Allen, American journalist
- Larry Allen, founder of Learning Technology Partners
- Larry Allen, member of American R&B vocal group The Modulations

== See also ==
- Lawrence Allen (disambiguation)
- Laurence Allen (disambiguation)
- Laurie Allen (disambiguation)
