= Early life of Fidel Castro =

Fidel Castro
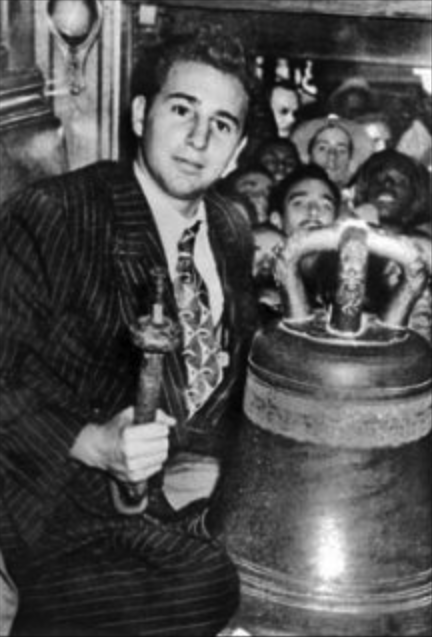
- Castro in 1947
- Born: Fidel Alejandro Castro Ruz; 13 August 1926; Birán, Oriente, Cuba
- Died: 25 November 2016 (aged 90); Havana, Cuba
- Occupations: Lawyer; politician

The early life of Cuban revolutionary and politician Fidel Castro spans the first 26 years of his life, from 1926 to 1952. Born in Birán, Oriente Province, Castro was the illegitimate son of Ángel Castro y Argiz, a wealthy farmer and landowner, and his mistress Lina Ruz González. First educated by a tutor in Santiago de Cuba, Fidel Castro then attended two boarding schools before being sent to El Colegio de Belén, a school run by Jesuits in Havana. In 1945 he began studying law at the University of Havana, where he first became politically conscious, becoming a staunch anti-imperialist and critic of United States involvement in the Caribbean. Involved in student politics, he was affiliated to Eduardo Chibás and his Partido Ortodoxo, achieving publicity as a vocal critic of the pro-U.S. administration of President Ramón Grau and his Partido Auténtico.

Immersed in the university's violent gang culture, in 1947 he took part in a quashed attempt to overthrow the military junta of Rafael Trujillo in the Dominican Republic. Returning to student politics, Castro was involved with violent demonstrations in which protesters clashed with riot police, at which he became increasingly left-wing in his views. Traveling to Bogotá, Colombia, he fought for the Liberals in the Bogotazo before returning to Havana, where he embraced Marxism. In 1948 he married the wealthy Mirta Díaz Balart, and in September 1949 their son Fidelito was born. Obtaining his Doctorate of Law in September 1950, he co-opened an unsuccessful law firm before entering parliamentary politics as a Partido Ortodoxo candidate. When General Fulgencio Batista launched a coup and overthrew the elected presidency, Castro brought legal challenges against him, but as this proved ineffective, he began to think of other ways to oust Batista.

== Childhood and education: 1926–1945 ==
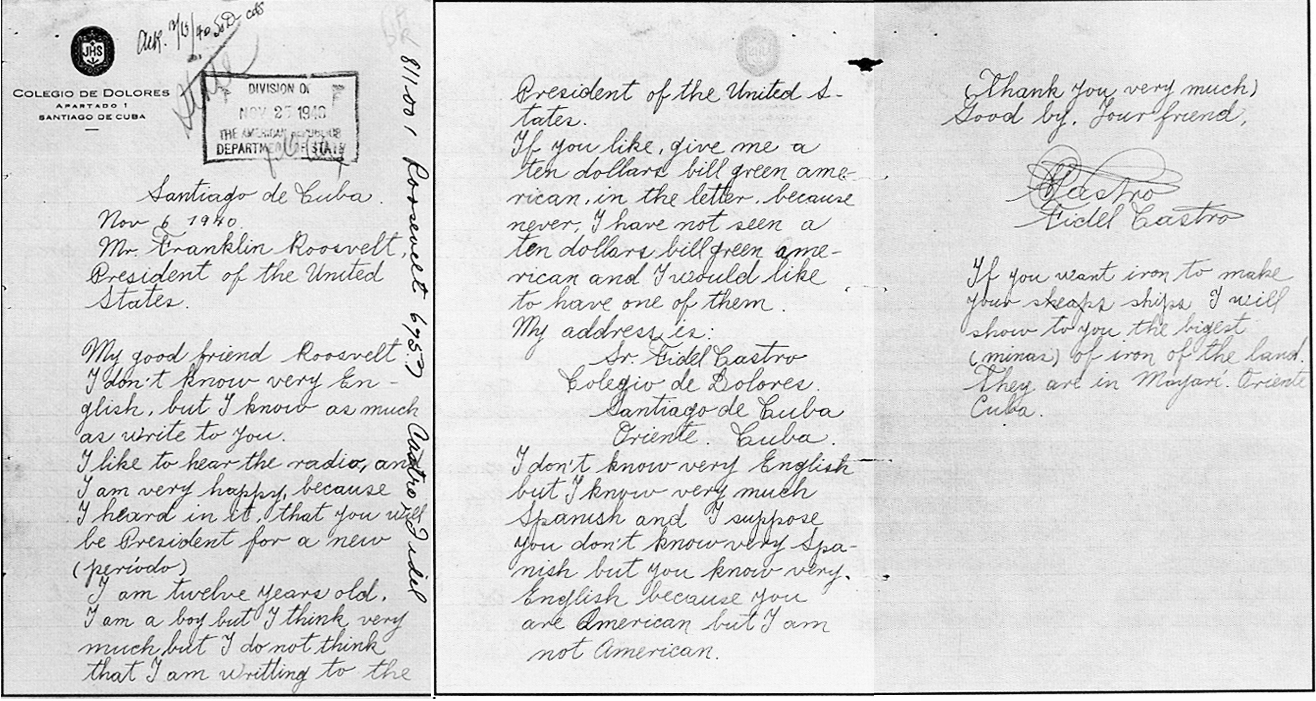
A letter written by the teenager Castro, learning English, to U.S. President Franklin D. Roosevelt—"My good friend Roosvelt [sic]." In the letter Castro expresses his joy at Roosevelt's re-election, states his age as "twelve years old" (a claim, which if true, would have meant that he was two years younger than he is officially reported to be) and writes, "If you like, give me a ten dollar bill green American [sic], because never, I have not seen a ten dollar bill", signing the letter, "Thank you very much. Good by [sic]. Your friend, Fidel Castro."

Castro's father, Ángel Castro y Argiz (1875–1956), was born to a poor peasant family in Galicia, a province in northwest Spain. A farm laborer, in 1895 he was conscripted into the Spanish Army to fight in the Cuban War of Independence and the ensuing Spanish–American War of 1898, in which the U.S. seized control of Cuba. In 1902, the Republic of Cuba was proclaimed; however it remained economically and politically dominated by the U.S. For a time, Cuba enjoyed economic growth, and Ángel migrated there in search of employment. After various jobs, he set up a business growing sugar cane at Las Manacas farm in Birán, near Mayarí, Oriente Province. Ángel took a wife in 1911, María Luisa Argota Reyes, with whom he had five children before separating. He then began a relationship with Lina Ruz González (1903–1963), a household servant of Canarian descent who was twenty-seven years his junior; they had three sons and four daughters, legally marrying in 1943.

Castro was Lina's third child, born out of wedlock at Ángel's farm on August 13, 1926. Because of the stigma of illegitimacy, he was given his mother's surname of Ruz rather than his father's name. Although Ángel's business ventures prospered, he ensured that Fidel grew up alongside the children of the farm's workforce, many of whom were Haitian economic migrants of African descent. This experience, Castro later related, prevented him from absorbing "bourgeois culture" at an early age.

Aged six, Castro, along with his elder siblings Ramón and Angela, was sent to live with their teacher in Santiago de Cuba, dwelling in cramped conditions and relative poverty, often failing to have enough to eat because of their tutor's poor economic situation. Aged eight, Castro was baptized into the Roman Catholic Church, although later became an atheist. Being baptized enabled Castro to attend the La Salle boarding school in Santiago, where he regularly misbehaved, and so was sent to the privately funded, Jesuit-run Dolores School in Santiago. In 1945 he graduated from high school in the prestigious Jesuit-run El Colegio de Belén in Havana. Although Castro took an interest in history, geography and debating at Belén, he did not excel academically, instead devoting much of his time to playing sport.

== University and early political activism: 1945–1948 ==
In late 1945, Castro began studying law at the University of Havana. Admitting he was "politically illiterate", he became embroiled in the student protest movement: under the regimes of Cuban Presidents Gerardo Machado, Fulgencio Batista and Ramón Grau there had been a crackdown on protest, with student leaders being killed or terrorized by gangs. This led to a form of gangsterismo culture within the university, dominated by armed student groups who spent much of their time fighting and running criminal enterprises. Passionate about Cuban nationalism and opposed to U.S. intervention in the Caribbean, Castro joined the University Committee for the Independence of Puerto Rico and the Committee for Democracy in the Dominican Republic. During an unsuccessful campaign for the presidency of the Federation of University Students (Federación Estudiantil Universitaria - FEU), he put forward a platform of "honesty, decency and justice" and emphasized his opposition to corruption, which he associated with U.S. involvement in Cuba.

Castro became critical of the corruption and violence of Grau's regime, delivering a public speech on the subject in November 1946 that earned him a place on the front page of several newspapers. In contact with members of student leftist groups – including the Popular Socialist Party (Partido Socialista Popular – PSP), the Socialist Revolutionary Movement (Movimiento Socialista Revolucionaria – MSR) and the Insurrectional Revolutionary Union (Unión Insurrecional Revolucionaria – UIR) – he grew close to the UIR, although biographers are unsure whether he became a member. In 1947, Castro joined a new populist group, the Party of the Cuban People (Partido Ortodoxo), founded by veteran politician Eduardo Chibás (1907–1951). A charismatic figure, Chibás advocated national revolution, social justice, political freedom, and anti-corruption measures. Though Chibás lost the election, Castro remained committed to working on his behalf. Student violence escalated after Grau employed gang leaders as police officers, and Castro soon received a death threat urging him to leave the university; he refused and began carrying a gun and surrounding himself with armed friends. In later years Castro was accused of attempting gang-related assassinations during this period, including that of UIR member Leonel Gómez, MSR leader Manolo Castro and university policeman Oscar Fernandez Caral, but these charges remain unproven.

== Latin American rebellions: 1947–1948 ==
In June 1947, Castro learned of a planned expedition to overthrow the right-wing military junta of Rafael Trujillo, a U.S. ally, in the Dominican Republic. Widely seen as a dictator, Trujillo utilized a violent secret police that routinely murdered and tortured opponents. Becoming president of the University Committee for Democracy in the Dominican Republic, Castro decided to join the expedition, led by Dominican exile General Juan Rodríguez. Launched from Cuba, the mission began on July 29, 1947; it consisted of around 1,200 men, most of whom were exiled Dominicans or Cubans. However, the Dominican and U.S. governments were prepared and soon quashed the rebellion. Grau's government arrested many of those involved before they set sail, but Castro escaped arrest by jumping off of his naval frigate and swimming to shore at night.

"I joined the people; I grabbed a rifle in a police station that collapsed when it was rushed by a crowd. I witnessed the spectacle of a totally spontaneous revolution... [T]hat experience led me to identify myself even more with the cause of the people. My still incipient Marxist ideas had nothing to do with our conduct – it was a spontaneous reaction on our part, as young people with Martí-an, anti-imperialist, anti-colonialist and pro-democratic ideas."

— Fidel Castro on the Bogotazo, 2009

The botched mission furthered Castro's opposition to the Grau administration, and returning to Havana, he took a leading role in the student protests against the killing of a high school pupil by government bodyguards. The protests, accompanied by a U.S.-imposed crackdown on those considered communists, led to violent clashes between protesters and police in February 1948, in which Castro was badly beaten. At this point his public speeches took on a distinctively leftist slant, condemning the social and economic inequalities of Cuba, something in contrast to his former public criticisms, which had centered on condemning corruption and U.S. imperialism.

After a quick visit to Venezuela and Panama, in April 1948 Castro traveled to the city of Bogotá, Colombia where the Pan-American Conference was taking place. Fidel's Cuban student group along with others attempted to organize the 1948 Pan-American Students Conference in opposition, sponsored by the government of Argentine President Juan Perón. Instead, the assassination of popular leftist leader Jorge Eliécer Gaitán Ayala led to widespread rioting that came to be known as the Bogotazo. Leaving 3000 dead, the riots revolved around clashes between the governing Conservatives – backed by the army – and leftist Liberals with support from socialists. Along with his fellow Cuban visitors, Castro joined the Liberal cause by stealing guns from a police station, but subsequent police investigations concluded that neither Castro nor any of the other Cubans had been involved in the killings.

== Marriage and Marxism: 1948–1950 ==
Returning to Cuba, Castro became a prominent figure in protests against the government's attempts to raise bus fares, a mode of transport used mostly by students and workers. That year, Castro married Mirta Díaz Balart, a student from a wealthy family through whom he was exposed to the lifestyle of the Cuban elite. The relationship was a love match, disapproved of by both families. Mirta's father gave them tens of thousands of dollars to spend in a three-month honeymoon in New York City, and the couple also received a U.S. $1,000 wedding gift from the military general and former president Fulgencio Batista, a friend of Mirta's family. That same year, Grau decided not to stand for re-election, which was instead won by his Partido Auténtico's new candidate, Carlos Prío Socarrás. Prío faced widespread protests when members of the MSR, now allied to the police force, assassinated Justo Fuentes, a self-educated black Cuban who was a prominent UIR member and friend of Castro's. In response, Prío agreed to quell the gangs, but found them too powerful to control.

"Marxism taught me what society was. I was like a blindfolded man in a forest, who doesn't even know where north or south is. If you don't eventually come to truly understand the history of the class struggle, or at least have a clear idea that society is divided between the rich and the poor and that some people subjugate and exploit other people, you're lost in a forest, not knowing anything."

— Fidel Castro on discovering Marxism, 2009

Castro had moved further left in his politics, influenced by the writings of Marxist communists like Karl Marx, Friedrich Engels and Vladimir Lenin. He came to interpret Cuba's problems as an integral part of capitalist society, or the "dictatorship of the bourgeoisie", rather than the failings of corrupt politicians. Adopting the Marxist idea that meaningful political change could only be brought about by a proletariat revolution, Castro visited Havana's poorest neighborhoods, witnessing the nation's social and racial inequalities, and became active in the University Committee for the Struggle against Racial Discrimination.

In September 1949, Mirta gave birth to a son, Fidelito, so the couple moved to a larger Havana flat. Castro continued to put himself at risk, staying active in the city's politics and joining the September 30 Movement, which contained within it both communists and members of the Partido Ortodoxo. The group's purpose was to oppose the influence of the violent gangs within the university; despite his promises, Prío had failed to control the situation, instead offering many of their senior members jobs in government ministries. Castro volunteered to deliver a speech for the Movement on November 13, exposing the government's secret deals with the gangs and identifying key members. Attracting the attention of the national press, the speech angered the gangs, and Castro fled into hiding, first in the countryside and then in the U.S. Returning to Havana several weeks later, Castro lay low and focused on his university studies, graduating as a Doctor of Law in September 1950.

== Career in law and politics: 1950–1952 ==
Castro founded a legal partnership with two fellow leftists, Jorge Azpiazu and Rafael Resende, focusing on helping poor Cubans assert their rights. A financial failure, its main client was a timber merchant who paid them in timber to furnish their office. Caring little for money or material goods, Castro failed to pay his bills; his furniture was repossessed and electricity cut off, distressing his wife. He took part in a high-school protest in Cienfuegos in November 1950, fighting a four-hour battle with police in protest at the Education Ministry's ban on the founding of student associations. Arrested and charged for violent conduct, the magistrate dismissed the charges. He also became an active member of the Cuban Peace Committee, campaigning against western involvement in the Korean War. His hopes for Cuba still centered on Eduardo Chibás and the Partido Ortodoxo; however Chibás had made a mistake when he accused Education Minister Aureliano Sánchez of purchasing a Guatemalan ranch with misappropriated funds, but was unable to substantiate his allegations. The government accused Chibás of being a liar, and in 1951 he shot himself during a radio broadcast, issuing a "last wake-up call" to the Cuban people. Castro was present and accompanied him to the hospital where he died.

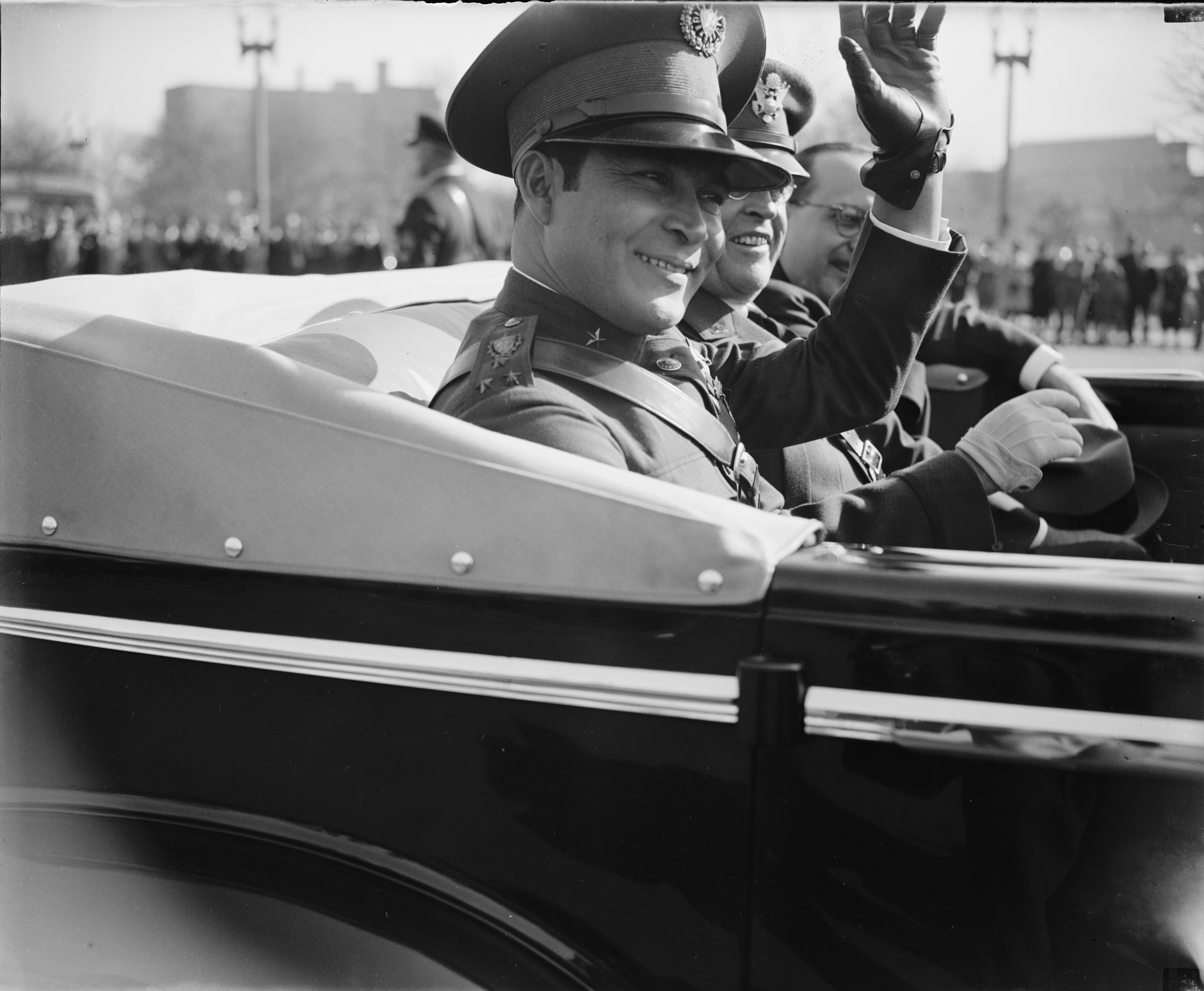
Castro intended to overthrow the presidency of General Fulgencio Batista (left, with U.S. Army Chief of staff Malin Craig).

Seeing himself as the heir to Chibás, Castro wanted to run for Congress in the June 1952 elections. Senior Ortodoxo members feared his radical reputation and refused to nominate him; instead he was nominated as a candidate for the House of Representatives by party members in Havana's poorest districts, and began campaigning. The Ortodoxo gained a considerable level of support and was predicted to do well in the election.

During his campaign, Castro met with General Fulgencio Batista, the former president who had returned to politics with the Unitary Action Party; although both opposed Prío's administration, their meeting never got beyond "polite generalities". In March 1952, Batista seized power in a military coup, with Prío fleeing to Mexico. Declaring himself president, Batista cancelled the planned presidential elections, describing his new system as "disciplined democracy"; Castro, like many others, considered it a one-man dictatorship. Batista moved to the right, solidifying ties with both the wealthy elite and the United States, severing diplomatic relations with the Soviet Union, suppressing trade unions, and persecuting Cuban socialist groups. Intent on opposing Batista's administration, Castro brought several legal cases against them, arguing that Batista had committed sufficient criminal acts to warrant imprisonment and accusing various ministers of breaching labor laws. His lawsuits coming to nothing, Castro began thinking of alternate ways to oust the new government.

== See also ==
- Early life of Vladimir Lenin
- Early life of Joseph Stalin
- Early life of Mao Zedong
- Early life of Xi Jinping
- Early life of Hugo Chávez
