= Silvina Fabars =

Cuban folk dancer and ballerina (1944–2025)

- Born: Silvina Fabars Gilall; 22 February 1944; Santiago de Cuba, Cuba
- Died: 31 March 2025 (aged 81)
- Occupations: Dancer, dance instructor
- Years active: 1959–2025
- Known for: 2014 National Dance Prize of Cuba recipient

Silvina Fabars (22 February 1944 – 31 March 2025) was a Cuban folk dancer and ballerina who was the principal dancer of the National Folkloric Ensemble of Cuba and a noted folk dance instructor throughout Latin America and Europe. She won numerous awards and recognition throughout her career including the Vanguardia Nacional, the Distinción por la Cultura Nacional (Distinction of the National Culture), and the Alejo Carpentier Medal. In 2014, she was honored as the recipient of the National Dance Prize of Cuba.

== Life and career ==
Silvina Fabars Gilall was born on 22 February 1944 in Santiago de Cuba, Cuba. Her ancestry includes grandparents from Guinea and Ghana, who helped raise her. As a child, she was taught to read and write by an aunt and was only able to attend elementary school for two or three years, as her labor was needed. She worked in the cane fields, planted sweet potatoes, picked coffee and hauled wood and water. She lived in a community of Haitians and learned their folk dances and patois. At the age of fourteen, she joined Fidel Castro's rebel army in the Sierra Maestra and participated in the Cuban Revolution. In 1959, she began working at the airport in San Antonio de los Banos as a member of the legendary Mariana Grajales Women's Squad. Around the same time, she co-founded the first Cuban folk dancing company, known as the Ballet Folklórico de Oriente (Eastern Folk Dancing Company), where she performed as a singer and dancer until 1965.

In 1966, Fabars was invited by the playwright and theater director, Eugenio Hernández Espinosa, to come to Havana and try out for the National Folkloric Ensemble (Spanish: Conjunto Folclórico Nacional) (CFN). She was hired as a singer, but after a serious accident which damaged her vocal cords, was offered a position as a hairdresser or makeup artist. Fabars was determined to continue performing as a dancer. Unfamiliar with the folk dances and traditions of the western part of Cuba, she studied with the anthropologist Fernando Ortiz Fernández, as well as many of the company's premier dancers, such as Santiago Alfonso, Luisa Barroso, Nieves Fresneda, Zenaida Hernandez and Emilio O’Farrill. By 1978, she was offered a professorship to teach dance and the following year, she became the principal dancer of the CFN. Some of her most noted performances include Yoruba Iyessá by the Mexican choreographer Rodolfo Reyes Cortés, which became a signature piece for Fabars; Ciclo Congo; Arara, which features spinning movements with a basket on her head; and Rumbas y comparsas, in which she was the zebra. She performed in most of the repertoire productions of the CFN and performed throughout the world, including in Algeria, Angola, Brazil, Canada, Colombia, England, France, Italy, Jamaica, Japan, Martinique, Mexico, Peru, Portugal, Spain, and the United States.

In addition to teaching at the CFN, Fabars taught throughout the country and helped establish groups and dance companies. As a teacher for the International Laboratory of Cuban Folklore which is a biannual course offered to teach Cuban dance, she taught at the University of Alberta, in Canada; University of Liverpool and University of London in England; at the Tokyo Cultural Center of Japan, as well as in Cuba, Russia and Venezuela. She spent two years in Venezuela helping the ministry of culture develop a folk dance company before returning to Cuba and establishing a folk dance training facility at the House of Culture in Camagüey, where she taught.

Throughout her career, Fabars won many honors. As part of the CFN, she shared in awards which include the Golden Sandal trophy from Festidanza 1974 held in Arequipa, Peru; in the Golden Barrel and Silver Necklace awarded by the 30th International Vineyard Festivities of Dijon, France (1975); the Silver Platter from the 1976 Billingham Folkloric Festival of Billingham, England; and the Golden Temple trophy from the 1988 Almond Blossom Festival of Agrigento, Sicily, among many others. Her individual awards include the Vanguardia Nacional (National Vanguard), the Distinción por la Cultura Nacional (Distinction of the National Culture), and the Alejo Carpentier Medal. In 2014, she was honored as the recipient of the National Dance Prize of Cuba.

Fabars died on 31 March 2025, at the age of 81.

== Sources ==
- Orovio, Helio (2004). Cuban Music from A to Z. Durham, North Carolina: Duke University Press. p. 148. ISBN 0-8223-8521-X.
