= Laurence Allen =

Laurence or Lawrence Allen may refer to:

- Laurence W. Allen (1892–1968), English World War I flying ace
- Laurence Edmund Allen (1906–1983), American journalist

== See also ==
- Larry Allen (disambiguation)
- Laurie Allen (disambiguation)
- Lawrence Allen (disambiguation)
