= Lawrence Allen =

Lawrence Allen may refer to:

- Lawrence Allen (racewalker) (1921–2018), British racewalker
- Lawrence Allen Jr. (born 1959), American politician and educator from Texas

== See also ==
- Laurence Allen (disambiguation)
- Larry Allen (disambiguation)
- Laurie Allen (disambiguation)
