= Early life of Xi Jinping =

Xi Jinping, the general secretary of the Chinese Communist Party and leader of China since 2012, was born on 15 June 1953 in Beijing. He was born to Xi Zhongxun, a high-ranking CCP politician, and his second wife Qi Xin. He attended the Beijing Bayi School. In 1963, Xi's father was purged from the CCP. In 1966, following the start of the Cultural Revolution, Xi's secondary education was cut short and he was persecuted due to his father's history. The Beijing Bayi School was closed and he was transferred to the Beijing No. 25 School. In 1968, Mao Zedong launched the Down to the Countryside Movement, leading Xi to travel to Liangjiahe Village, Yan'an, Shaanxi in 1969. Unable to stand rural life, Xi briefly fled back to Beijing but was arrested and later returned to the village. Xi joined the Communist Youth League at the village. In 1973, Yanchuan County assigned Xi to Zhaojiahe Village in Jiajianping Commune, where he led educational campaigns there before returning to Liangjiahe the same year. After several attempts, Xi joined the CCP in 1974, and became the Party branch secretary of the Liangjiahe. In 1975, Xi was accepted as a worker-peasant-soldier student to Tsinghua University and left Liangjiahe. Studying chemical engineering at the university, he graduated in 1979.

== Early life ==
Xi Jinping was born on 15 June 1953 in Beijing. He was third child of Xi Zhongxun and his second wife Qi Xin. After the founding of the PRC in 1949, Zhongxun held a series of posts, including the chief of the Publicity Department of the Chinese Communist Party, vice premier, and vice chairman of the Standing Committee of the National People's Congress. Xi has two older sisters, Qi Qiaoqiao (齐桥桥), born in 1949 and Qi An'an (齐安安), born in 1952. Zhongxun was from Fuping County, Shaanxi. Xi's childhood name, a common practice in China, was Xiangjin. Xi, along with Qiaoqiao, An'an and Yuanping all went to Beijing Bayi School, where students were primarily the children of high-ranking military officials. Xi later said in 2014 that he felt out of place in the school:

The August 1 Middle School is a school for military children, so most of the parents of my classmates were in the military. Every weekend, when the parents came to pick up my classmates, they wore epaulettes and badges. It was very impressive. I thought to myself, Why does father not have an epaulette? When I returned home on the weekend, I asked my family, Why is it that my father does not have a military uniform, does not have a military rank? My family told me that father was not in the military system, father was vice-premier [fu zongli]! The next day, I returned to the dormitory, and I proudly told my buddies what my father did! He is vice-director [fu jingli]! But my classmates chipped in and asked, vice-director? Your father runs a market?

In 1963, when Xi was ten years old, his father was purged from the CCP and sent to work in a factory in Luoyang, Henan. Qi Xin was driven out of Beijing, meaning the Xi children were left to fend for themselves. Xi Jinping was harassed at the school, but was not expelled as children of disgraced officials were not held accountable for their parent's crimes.

=== Cultural Revolution ===
In May 1966, the Cultural Revolution cut short Xi's secondary education when all secondary classes were halted for students to criticise and fight their teachers. Student militants ransacked the Xi family home. Xi was forbidden from being a Red Guard due to his father's history. He fought back and angered the "rebels". Xi associated and became the "little king" of a group of boys near the school whose parents were targeted during the Cultural Revolution. In 1984, Xi described his experiences during the Cultural Revolution:

During the ten years of chaos [the Cultural Revolution], my entire family was attacked. At the time, I was fifteen. Because of my "dissatisfaction with the Cultural Revolution", the Special Case Committee placed me in isolation for investigation, and, from morning until night, I was questioned and forced to persevere while standing up in the "jetplane position" as punishment. One time, during the Lunar New Year, my younger brother sent me a plate of dumplings. I really wanted to eat them, but the people on the Special Case Committee stole them away and said, "Do you know what kind of people ate dumplings in the past? You do not want to eat those dumplings. You want to relive the heavenly lifestyle from the past that you lost. That's just a dream!" Soon thereafter, in August, I was imprisoned. I had only one, unlined, item of clothing, and by December, it was already very cold. At night, I slept on the icy floor. I used an icy brick as a pillow. My entire body was covered in lice. I collapsed from sickness, and I even thought of death.

In 1996, he further added:

In reality I suffered more than most people. During the Cultural Revolution, I was jailed four times. As a "reactionary student", I was castigated at more than a dozen struggle meetings. I suffered hunger and experienced being a beggar. I was infested with fleas when I was in jail. As a fifteen-year-old I had to endure the stigma of being "black material" and had to join a production brigade in northern Shaanxi. In a flash it was seven years there. I was then transformed from among the "five black categories", a "bastard", and a "reactionary student" into a Communist Youth League member, a party member, and then a secretary of the village branch. ... I became a peasant and learned a whole set of peasant language and was one of the best laborers in the village. This experience has strengthened my belief and self-confidence, making me feel that there is no suffering that cannot be borne in this world.

The Beijing Bayi School was assaulted on 25 January 1967, and later closed shortly after, leading Xi to be transferred to the Beijing No. 25 School. Due to his family, Xi was considered to be among the "blackest" students in the class. Xi was also persecuted at the Marx School of Communism, where his mom Qi was employed, including his mom denouncing him; he later said that he was "dragged out" for persecution by Cao Yi'ou, wife of Kang Sheng, due to being a "family member of a 'black gang'." His mother was forced to publicly denounce his father, as he was paraded before a crowd as an enemy of the revolution. His father was later imprisoned in 1968 when Xi was aged 15. By 1968, students at the Beijing No. 25 School had turned to Red Guards, leading the school to dissolve to warring factions. Xi was threatened to be sent by the police to a juvenile correction establishment, but was not sent as the facility was full. In December 1968, CCP Chairman Mao Zedong launched the Down to the Countryside Movement. Xi, quickly submitted an application to the Bayi School's Reform Committee to go to Yan'an and insisted on leaving Beijing for the countryside. His case was approved quickly as going to the countryside was considered "politically correct" behavior.

=== Liangjiahe village ===
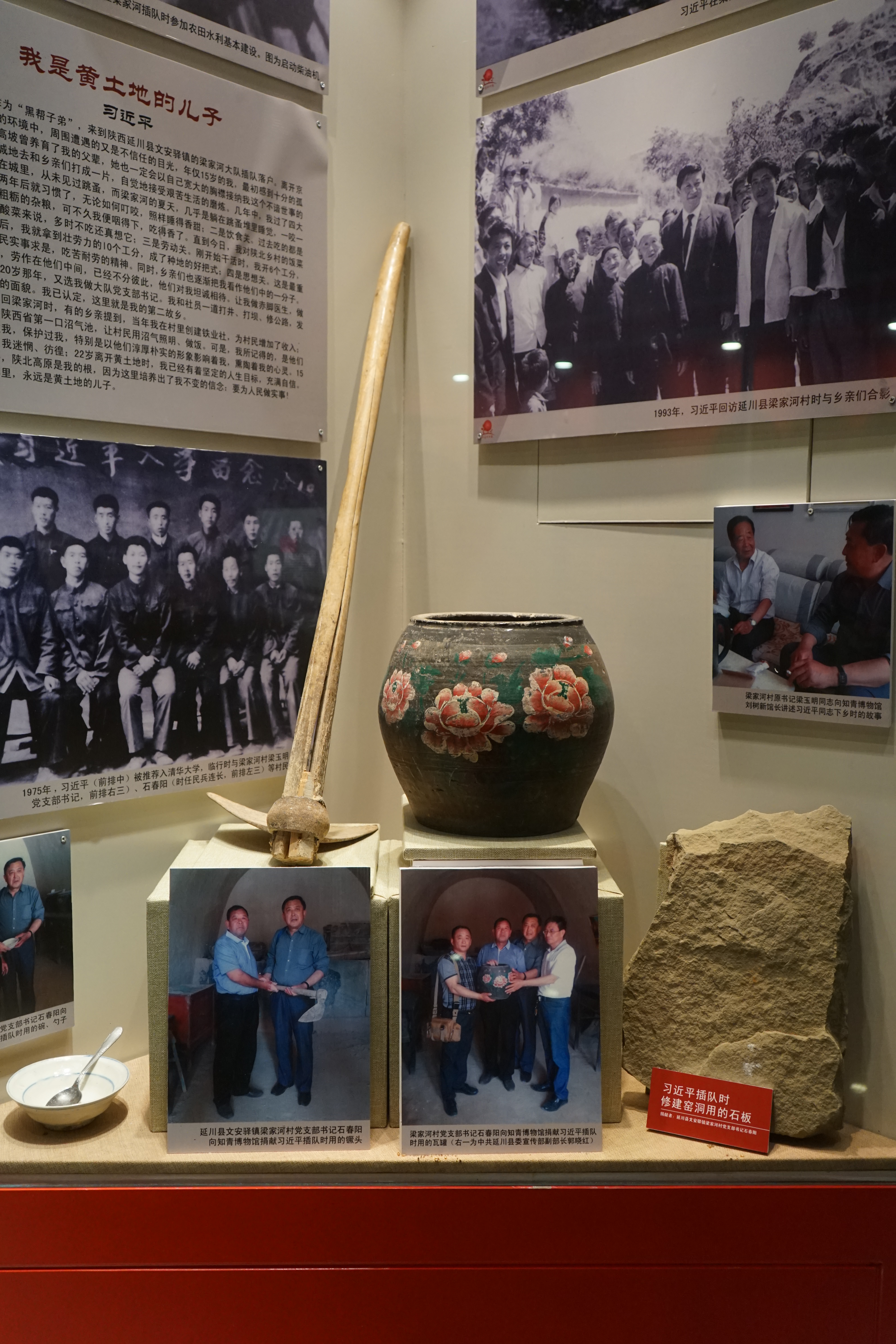
Items used by Xi Jinping during his time working in the countryside in Liangjiahe.

On 13 January 1969, they left Beijing, boarding the "East Is Red" train, and arrived in Liangjiahe Village, Yan'an, Shaanxi, on 23 January. The rural areas of Yan'an were very backward, which created a big gap for Xi as a teenager. He first tried to go to his father's ancestral home in Fuping County, where he thought relatives, belonging to the Five Red Categories could give him refuge. However, the relatives did not give him refuge, leading Xi to go to Yan'an. Xi once recalled that he had to overcome "five hurdles" (flea, food, life, labor and thought hurdle), and the experience led him to feel affinity with the rural poor. He also admitted he refused to work and did not get along well with the peasants. He was not very compliant and started becoming a heavy smoker. After a few months, unable to stand rural life, he ran away to Beijing. He was arrested for four to five months during a crackdown on deserters from the countryside and sent to a work camp to dig ditches. He later returned to the village, under the persuasion of his aunt Qi Yun and uncle Wei Zhenwu. He then spent a total of seven years in Liangjiahe, where he lived in a cave house. He came with an attitude to "get close and understand the masses, and receive re-education from the poor, lower, and middle peasants". In Liangjiahe, Xi suffered mistreatment due to his father's status.

At the village, Xi learned to sew, and developed an avid love for reading, especially for classical essays and poetry. He also gradually became more connected to the villagers. He was considered to be bookish, with a particular interest in modern history and the Chinese classics. By 1970, Xi's house had become the center of the village, with even the local party secretary regularly conferring to him. Xi variously worked as a barefoot doctor, a bookkeeper, and an agricultural technician. Xi needed to apply for eight times before joining the Communist Youth League, and a local party leader was criticized for even attempting to support Xi's bid due to his father's status. Also during the Cultural Revolution, Xi's sister Heping hanged herself at her military academy. Xi learned about her death while digging an air-raid shelter in preparation for a possible Soviet attack, and stepped away so that no one would see him cry. In 1972, after learning her mother was dying, Qi Xin requested the Party School release her to visit Beijing. After it was approved, all Xi family members except Xi Zhongxun attended a reunion in Beijing. The Xi family decided to write to Premier Zhou Enlai to request a meeting with Xi Zhongxun, which was approved, allowing him to meet his family. After learning Jinping had become a CYL member, Zhongxun encouraged him to apply for CCP membership and stay in northern Shaanxi. From this time on, Qi Xin was permitted a yearly return to Beijing to visit her husband and to have a family reunion.

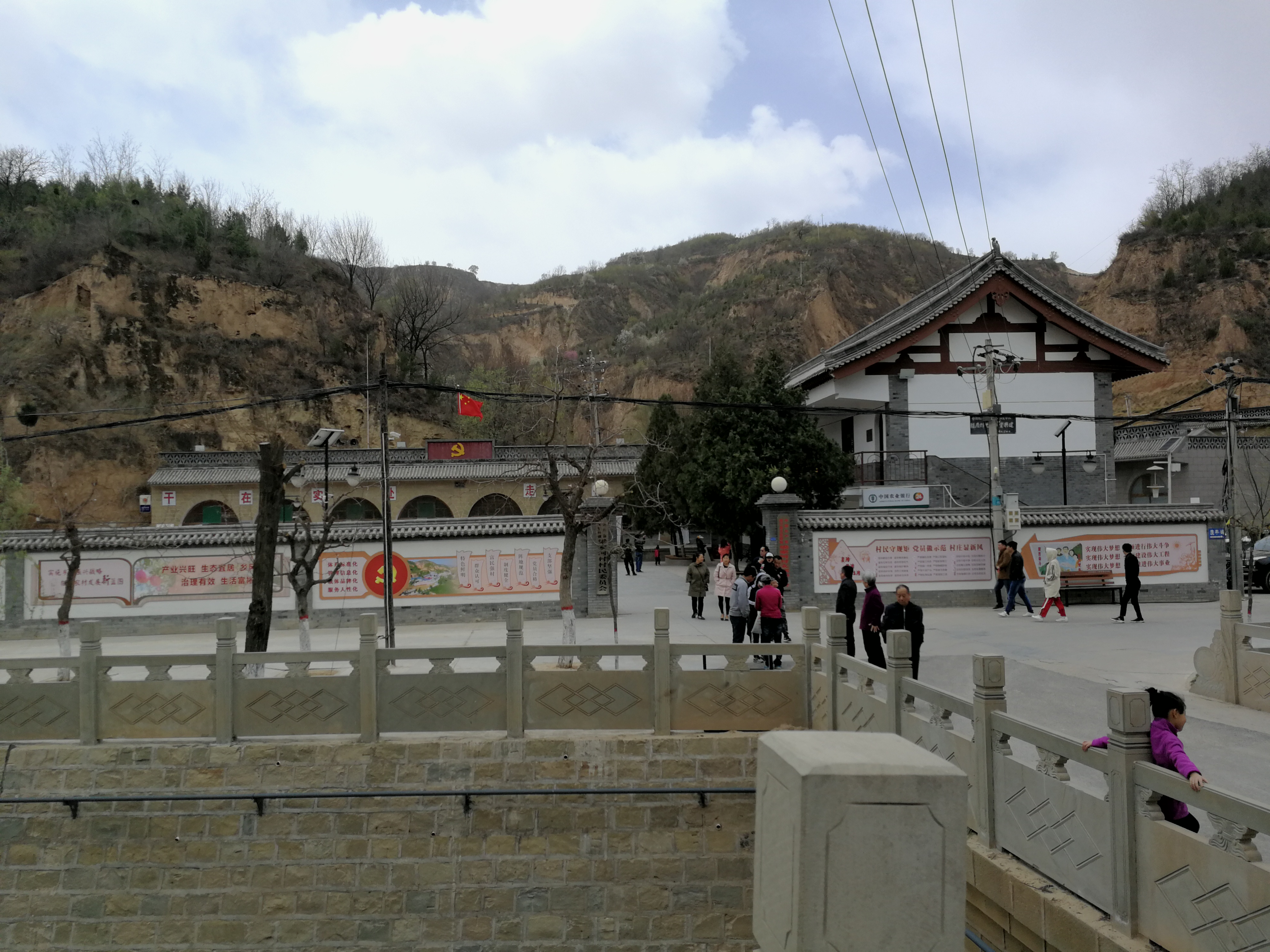
Liangjiahe, where Xi once lived and worked, is located in Yanchuan County, Yan'an City, Shaanxi Province.

In 1973, Yanchuan County assigned Xi Jinping to Zhaojiahe Village in Jiajianping Commune to lead social education efforts. Xi led the "socialist line education movement" in the village. Due to his effective work and strong rapport with the villagers, the community expressed a desire to keep him there. However, after Liangjiahe Village advocated for his return, Xi went back in July that same year. Liang Yuming (梁玉明) and Liang Youhua (梁有华), the village branch secretaries, supported his application to the Chinese Communist Party. Yet, due to his father, Xi Zhongxun, still facing political persecution, the application was initially blocked by higher authorities. The commune secretary opposed his party membership, and criticized the person supporting Xi's application as allowing a "son of a black gang" into the party. Despite submitting ten applications, it was not until the new commune secretary, Bai Guangxing (白光兴), recognized Xi's capabilities that his application was forwarded to the CCP Yanchuan County Committee and approved in January 1974. Around that time, as Liangjiahe village underwent leadership changes, Xi was recommended to become the Party branch secretary of the Liangjiahe Brigade.

After taking office, Xi noted that Mianyang, Sichuan was using biogas technology and, given the fuel shortages in his village, he traveled to Mianyang to learn about biogas digesters. Upon returning, he successfully implemented the technology in Liangjiahe, marking a breakthrough in Shaanxi that soon spread throughout the region. Xi started to feel more connection to the villagers, assisting them to sink wells, build levees, and repair roads. He was responsible for mass criticism campaigns, which was more relaxed in rural areas. Additionally, he led efforts to drill wells for water supply, establish iron industry cooperatives, reclaim land, plant flue-cured tobacco, and set up sales outlets to address the village's production and economic challenges. Mao declared on 21 December 1974 that Xi Zhongxun should be released, though Kang Sheng was able to stall the acquittal for five months. After his released, Xi Zhongxun was sent to the Luoyang Refractory Materials factory.

=== University education ===
In 1973, Xi wrote a national entrance exam applied to Tsinghua University but was rejected due to his father's status. In 1975, when Yanchuan County was allocated only two spots at Tsinghua University, the CCP Yanchuan County Committee recommended Xi for admission; Xi put Tsinghua University as his first, second, and third choices. In the summer of 1975, the leftist radical leaders at the university were distracted and not managing the university's practical affairs, allowing Xi to be accepted by vice dean Liu Bing. In 1975, Xi left Yanchuan to arrive on the campus on 20 October. From 1975 to 1979, Xi studied chemical engineering at Tsinghua University as a worker-peasant-soldier student in Beijing. In April 1976, he cautioned his fellow students against participating in protests in Tiananmen Square that commemorated the death of Premier Zhou Enlai out of fear of persecution. He graduated in April 1979.
