= Laurence Edmund Allen =

American journalist and foreign correspondent

Laurence "Larry" Edmund Allen
- Born: October 19, 1908; Mount Savage, Maryland
- Died: May 12, 1975 (aged 66); Mexico
- Occupations: Journalist, Foreign Correspondent
- Known for: Coverage of British Mediterranean Seas

Laurence "Larry" Edmund Allen was an American journalist for the Associated Press from 1933 to 1961. Known for his coverage of British Mediterranean Fleet, for which he won first Pulitzer Prize for Telegraphic Reporting in 1942, he was also a prolific reporter on rise of communism in Poland and Cuba.

== Biography ==
Larry Allen was born on October 19, 1908, in Mt. Savage, Maryland. He began his journalistic career in the local bureau of the Baltimore News in 1926. He subsequently moved to West Virginia and joined the Daily Mail in Charleston, where he worked as a reporter and a telegraph editor for six years. In 1933, he was hired by the Associated Press's local bureau, where he worked as a local reporter and a site editor. After two years, he was transferred to Washington. In 1937, he moved to New York, where he became a foreign cables deskman.

Allen served as a European war correspondent for the Associated Press since July 1938 when he sailed to Europe to cover the Spanish Civil War and the dismemberment of Czechoslovakia following the Munich crisis. When World War II broke out the AP assigned him to cover the British Mediterranean Fleet, making him the first war correspondent to travel with the British Fleet in wartime. During his assignment he took part as a journalist in the Battle of Crete and the Tobruk's raid. After the operation's failure, he was captured by Axis forces and held prisoner in Italy for 11 months.

Allen survived eight torpedo attacks and was held in a Nazi prison camp for eight months. In 1942, the journalist was awarded the Pulitzer Prize for Telegraphic Reporting and the National Headliner Club Award for his combat correspondence during World War II. In 1945, Allen was also awarded the Bronze Star for the Defending Freedom Press as Prisoner of War, in 1947 — the Order of the British Empire by King George VI.

In September 1945 he arrived in Poland was an Associated Press correspondent on the occasion of General Eisenhower's visit to the country. He was a part of a reporter group which stayed permanently in Poland and regularly corresponded with Stanisław Mikołajczyk, leader of PSL (Polskie Stronnictwo Ludowe). Shortly after his arrival in September, Allen reopened the pre-war AP office in Warsaw. He covered the Communist takeover of Poland and directly criticized the actions of the communists for which he was attacked, and his works were censored by the regime and UB (Urząd Bezpieczeństwa). He took part in press conferences with Mikołajczyk and Bolesław Bierut about the Polish government reaction to the British and American diplomatic notes from 5 January 1947[5]. He cooperated with American ambassador Bliss Lane. Allen described the attack on Mikołajczyk on the day of the Polish election of 1947.

He then moved to Moscow in 1949, where he headed the Associated Press news bureau. Allen held the same position in Tel Aviv in 1950, and then he was assigned to Singapore. There he was caught in the riots, during which he was badly beaten and left for death. Fortunately, he managed to get to a hospital. In 1951 he was sent to Indochina, where he covered the battle of Dien Bien Phu during the First Indochina War. Before the end of the Indochinese war in 1955, the French High Command decorated Allen with the Croix de Guerre for frontline reporting “without fear of danger.” In the years 1957–1959, he travelled the Caribbean-South American area, where he wrote about troubles and revolutions. He visited Venezuela, Colombia, the British West Indies, Dominican Republic and Haiti. In Haiti he met his future wife Helen Fazakery Quinsberry. In 1957, Allen focused on the Fidel Castro takeover in Cuba. He warned that revolution was “Communist-led, supported, financed and directed.” He also claimed that after Castro's triumph, he was one of the victims of violence in Havana. In 1959 Allen organized his own news service called the American Press Service. Two years later he retired.

== Books ==
- Brennan (1999). Who's who of Pulitzer Prize Winners. Westport: Greenwood Publishing Group. p. 592. ISBN 9781573561112.
- Fischer, H.; Fischer, E. J. (2002). Complete Biographical Encyclopedia of Pulitzer Prize Winners, 1917-2000: Journalists, Writers and Composers on Their Ways to the Coveted Awards. Vienna: Walter de Gruyter. p. 4. ISBN 9783598301865.
- Lett B. (2014). An Extraordinary Italian Imprisonment: The Brutal Truth of Campo 21, 1942–1943. Barnsley: Pen and Sword. p. 256. ISBN 9781473843011.
