= The Second Yuying Foreign Languages School of Nanjing =

Language school in Nanjing, China

The Second Yuying Foreign Languages School of Nanjing is a state-owned, privately run school established in 1993 in Nanjing, China. The school covers an area of 18 acres and has two campuses, offering 72 classes, with more than 2,700 students and 400 staff.

== Development ==
When the school started in 1993, it had 2 classes and 19 staff.

== English feature ==
Every year, the school sends a teacher to a foreign nation for training, and invites foreign teachers to the school.
