= Laurie Allen =

Laurie Allen or Lori Allen may refer to:

- Laurie Allen (1942–2002) of Bobby & Laurie, Australian singer, and of the Laurie Allen Revue
- Laurie Allen (curler) (born c. 1963), Canadian curler
- Laurie Allen (judge), Canadian judge
- Lori Allen (astronomer), American astronomer
- Lori Allen (businessperson), American bridal salon owner and breast cancer awareness advocate
- Lori Beth Allen, fictional recurring character on 1970s television series Happy Days

== See also ==
- Lori Alan, American actress
- Laura Allen, American actress
- Laura Allen (make-up artist), British make-up artist
- Laurie Allan (born 1943), English drummer
- Laurie Allyn, American jazz singer
- Lawrence Allen (disambiguation)
- Laurence Allen (disambiguation)
