= Pan-American Conference =

Meetings of the Pan-American Union

- Location: Various
- Cause: Diplomatic

The Conferences of American States, commonly referred to as the Pan-American Conferences, were meetings of the International American Nation in Conferences for Regional cooperation in 1889. The Pan-American Union, an international organization for cooperation on trade. James G. Blaine, a United States politician, Secretary of State and presidential contender, first proposed establishment of closer ties between the United States and its southern neighbors and proposed international conference. Blaine hoped that ties between the United States and its southern counterparts would open Latin American markets to US trade. The Pan-American Union eventually evolved into the Organization of American States in 1948.

== History ==
In the 1820s, Simon Bolivar called for the first Pan-American Conference so that governments of newly liberated former colonies of Spain could collaborate on common issues. Only four countries attended a conference in 1826 in Panama, although seven had responded favorably to the invitation. U.S. representatives arrived too late to Panama to participate in the conference. The appointment of the U.S. delegates was delayed by debate in the U.S. House and Senate over the nature of the conference and whether Bolivar intended the conference to result in a confederacy of newly liberated states.

=== International Conferences of Latin American States ===
Dates / Year	City	Country	Conference	Notes
June 22, 1826	Panama City	Panama	Congress of Panama	Initiated by general Simon Bolivar
December 1847 – March 1, 1848	Lima	Peru	The Second Latin American Conferences	
September 1856	Santiago	Chile	The Third Latin American Conference	In September 1856 the delegates signed the Continental Treaty
November 1864	Lima	Peru	The Fourth Latin American Conference	

The four Latin American Conferences took place prior to the Pan-American Conferences but were highly influential in the campaign to create the Pan-American Union. They are as follows:

Congress of Panama on June 22, 1826, in Panama City Initiated by general Simon Bolivar (a Venezuelan political and military leader), the first Latin American Conference took place in Panama. Bolivar wanted to unite all of Latin America together in order to prevent invasion by the United States as well as other major powers at that time. The United States was permitted to send representatives, and President John Quincy Adams supported the initiative, but the United States Congress was slow to provide funding for the delegation and the U.S. representatives failed to attend the conference. Titled the Panama Congress, the countries agreed to unite, convene with each other on a regular basis and provide financial and military backing to the treaty.

The Second Latin American Conference, December 1847 – March 1, 1848 in Lima, Peru The Latin American Conference in Lima, Peru was in response to two threats: the fear of Spanish designs upon South America's west coast and the U.S. incursion into Mexico. Although the United States were in the middle of a war with Mexico at the time of the conference, the United States was permitted to send a representative to serve as a symbol of unity to the forces present outside of the Americas (mainly Europe).

The Third Latin American Conference in September 1856 in Santiago Although this conference consisted of only two meetings, it was called due to the worry that the Latin Americans had towards the United States regarding their want of more territory and this time the United States was not invited. There was an attempt at signing a Continental Treaty but it fell through due to disagreements between the delegates.

The fourth Latin American Conference in November 1864 in Lima, Peru Failed in its attempts to make any agreements regarding the intervention that had taken place by mostly European powers. At this time, there had been an increased amount of interaction between Latin America and the United States through the actions that the European powers took regarding the Dominican Republic, Mexico and the Chincha Islands. On 2 December 1823, President James Monroe delivered the 'Monroe Doctrine' which would eventually influence Secretary of State James G. Blaine to push for the creation of the Pan-American Conferences. In this speech, President Monroe stated that any further attempts by the Europeans to colonize the American continent (North, Central and South) would be seen as an act of aggression and would risk intervention by the United States. This doctrine was set in place in order to ensure that the colonies that were currently in place (and independent) would remain that way and to ensure that America would be able to remain independent of each other and yet bond each other together at the same time. This unofficial union of the countries that comprised North, Central and South America would allow for relationships to slowly develop between the countries.

In an attempt to solidify the idea of the "Western Hemisphere", Secretary of State James. G. Blaine determined that if the United States were to be the country that put forward the idea of a Union of America, the United States would hold the upper hand and would be able to guide the agenda as well as carry heavy weight in major decision-makings. Another reason for this union was for the United States to be financially benefited from the other countries – this is an aspect that the other countries soon realized, and through the conferences, attempted to prevent this from occurring.

However, when President James Garfield was assassinated, Secretary Blaine was removed from his post and the process for creating the Pan-American Conference was slowed down. Eventually, through the lobbying of Congress, Blaine was able to schedule the first Pan-American Conference in January 1889.

== Coinage of Pan-Americanism ==
First used in the New York Evening Post in 1888, the term "Pan-Americanism" was coined. Pan-Americanism refers to the movement toward commercial, social, economic, military, and political cooperation among the nations of North, Central, and South America. The term was largely used the following year at the First International Conference of American States in Washington D.C. 1889–90.

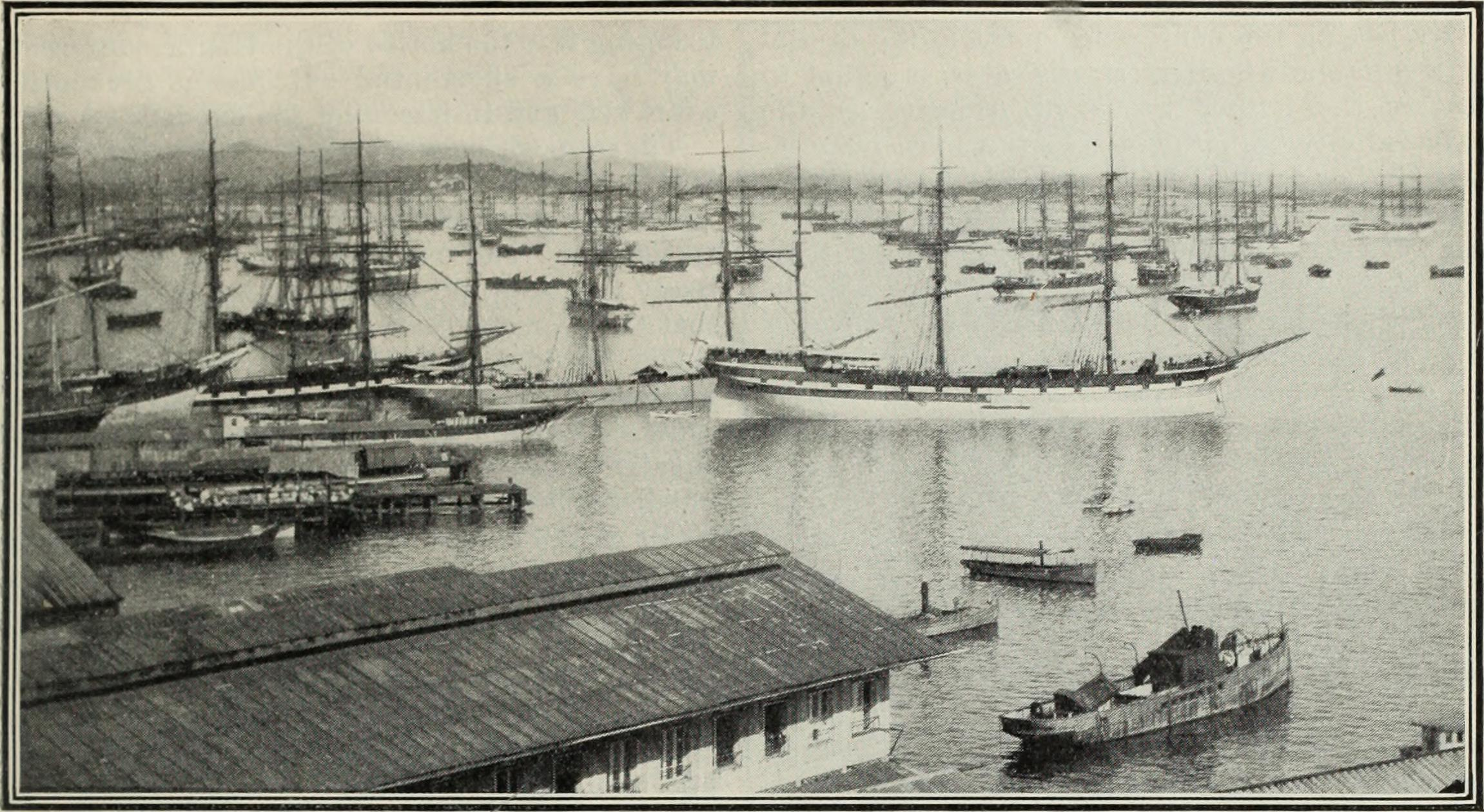
OAS building, Washington

== List of American-led Pan-American Conferences ==
International summits have been held in the following cities:

=== International Conferences of American States ===
Dates / Year	City	Country	Notes
October 2, 1889 – April 1890	Washington, D.C.	United States	Pan American Union
October 22, 1901 – January 31, 1902	Mexico City	Mexico	Second Panamerican Conference.
July 21 – August 26, 1906	Rio de Janeiro	Brazil	Third Panamerican Conference.
July 12 – August 30, 1910	Buenos Aires	Argentina	Fourth Panamerican Conference.
March 25 – May 3, 1923	Santiago	Chile	Fifth Panamerican Conference. Pan-American Treaty
January 16 – February 20, 1928	Havana	Cuba	Sixth Panamerican Conference: Convention on Private International Law (February 20, 1928); Convention regarding the Status of Aliens in the respective Territories of the Contracting Parties (February 20, 1928); Convention concerning the Duties and Rights of States in the event of Civil Strife (February 20, 1928); Convention on Maritime Neutrality (February 20, 1928); Convention on Commercial Aviation (February 20, 1928); Convention regarding Diplomatic Officers (February 20, 1928); Established the Inter-American Commission of Women
December 3–26, 1933	Montevideo	Uruguay	Seventh Panamerican Conference: Convention on Rights and Duties of States (December 26, 1933); The U.S. accepts the principle of non-intervention in Latin America, consistent with Franklin Delano Roosevelt's Good Neighbor Policy.
December 3–26, 1936	Buenos Aires	Argentina	Special Conference for the Maintenance of Peace
December 9–27, 1938	Lima	Peru	Eighth Panamerican Conference: Due to the precursor events of World War II and the prospect of fighting a two-front war, the United States was attempting to ensure its security through gaining support and defense in Latin America. This caused Mexican President Lázaro Cárdenas to put forward a non-intervention policy in the Americas in order to prevent involvement by the United States military.; Permanently established the Inter-American Commission of Women
January 15–28, 1942	Rio de Janeiro	Brazil	The meeting was organized in the wake of US entry into World War II as well as the United States' intention to use the occasion to offer additional economic assistance to Latin America countries, in return for security cooperation and the severing of diplomatic ties with the Axis powers.
February 21–8 March 1945	Mexico City	Mexico	Inter-American Conference on Problems of War and Peace: The goals of the Inter-American Conference on Problems of War and Peace were to establish the status of Argentina, relate regional security to the United Nations, and consider postwar American economic aid. Argentina would be readmitted if it declared war on Germany. The issue of American aid was postponed. the conference adopted a formal resolution called the Act of Chapultepec which proclaimed the principle of collective self-defense through regional pacts. This policy was adopted by the United Nations and article 51 of the UN charter.
March 30 – May 2, 1948	Bogotá	Colombia	Ninth Panamerican Conference: Led by Alberto Lleras Camargo and General George C. Marshall, created the Organization of American States
March 1–28, 1954	Caracas	Venezuela	Tenth Panamerican Conference: US Secretary of State John Foster Dulles attempted to convince the delegates that Jacobo Árbenz's Guatemala represented a communist threat to the Western hemisphere. The US government was later successful in overthrowing the Guatemalan government by secretly instigating a military coup d'état.
1967	Buenos Aires	Argentina	Third Extraordinary Inter-American Conference: The Protocol of Buenos Aires is adopted and the General Assembly becomes the primary organ of the OAS.
December 9, 1985	Cartagena	Colombia	Inter-American Convention to Prevent and Punish Torture

=== Special conferences on peace and security ===
- December 1–23, 1936: Inter-American Conference for the Maintenance of Peace (Buenos Aires)
- February 21 – March 8, 1945: Inter-American Conference on Problems of War and Peace (Mexico City)
- August 15 – September 2, 1947: Inter-American Conference for the Maintenance of Continental Peace and Security (Rio de Janeiro)
- April 1948 Pan-American Students Conference was a student conference held in Bogotá, Colombia in opposition to the Ninth Panamerican Conference in Bogotá.

=== Meetings of foreign ministers ===
- September 23 – October 3, 1939: First Meeting of the Foreign Ministers of the American Republics (Panama City)
- July 21–30, 1940: Second Meeting of the Foreign Ministers of the American Republics (Havana)
- January 15–28, 1942: Third Meeting of the Foreign Ministers of the American Republics (Rio de Janeiro)

== See also ==
- Organization of American States
- Summit of the Americas

== Bibliography ==
- Calhoun, Charles William (2005). Benjamin Harrison. New York: Times Books. ISBN 978-0-8050-6952-5.
- Crapol, Edward P. (2000). James G. Blaine: Architect of Empire. Biographies in American Foreign Policy. Vol. 4. Wilmington, Delaware: Scholarly Resources. ISBN 978-0-8420-2604-8.
- Helleiner, Eric. Forgotten Foundations of Bretton Woods: International Development and the Making of the Postwar Order, Cornell University 2014 ISBN 978-0801452758
- Long, T. (2020). "Historical Antecedents and Post-World War II Regionalism in the Americas." World Politics.
- Vanden, H.E., Prevost, G. Politics of Latin America: The Power Game (2nd Edition), 2006.
- Coates, B. “The Pan-American Lobbyist: William Eleroy Curtis and U.S. Empire, 1884-1899”, 2014.
