= Zhenze Middle School =

School in Suzhou, Jiangsu, China

Zhenze Middle School (震泽中学) was established in 1923, by two brothers, Shi Zhaozeng (施肇曾) and Shi Zhaoji (施肇基). It located in Zhenze, which is a small town in Wujiang, Suzhou, Jiangsu Province, China.

== History ==
In 1923, the school was established as a private junior high school. Ten years later, the senior high school branch was added, with the name of Yuying (育英), which meant to cultivate talents. In 1937, Yuying High School was set up in Shanghai. In 1945, the whole school changed its name to Yuying Middle School, including the Yuying High School in Shanghai, which started to exist as a branch campus.

The school had been private until 1953, when the government reformed it and removed the high school branch. The school gained a new life as Zhenze Junior High, Wujiang. Five years later in 1958, the name changed again to Zhenze Middle School, with the reestablishment of the high school branch. In 1990, the junior high branch was removed. Thus it became a high school only under the name of middle school. Such situation lasted until 2007, when Zhenze No.1 Middle School, which was a junior high school, was combined with the school. In 2003, the school obtained a new name, Zhenze Middle School, Jiangsu Province. That means that it is named after the name of the province, which is an excellent honor for any school in China. The name lasts until now. In 2007, the high school branch moved to the new campus in the capital of Wujiang, with the junior branch left in Zhenze.

== Layout ==
=== The old campus ===
The old campus is located in Taiping Street, Zhenze, with the square measure of 101,735 square meters. The whole campus is made up of three parts, each of which has different function. The teaching part contains four teaching buildings, one administration building, one library, one practical building and one hall. The campus is filled with the traditional feeling of the southern China, with several specific corners, the main road with a line of large trees standing on both sides. And of course, some ancient buildings.
Beside the gate of the campus, is the ancestral shrine of Wang Xingshan, who was a great astronomer during the Ming dynasty.

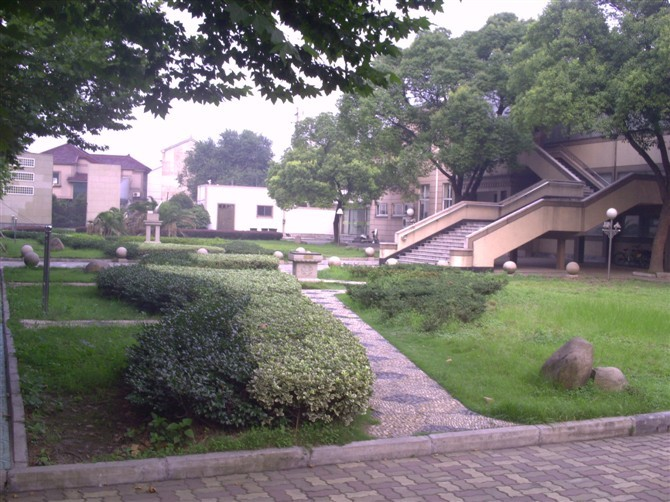
Library (old)

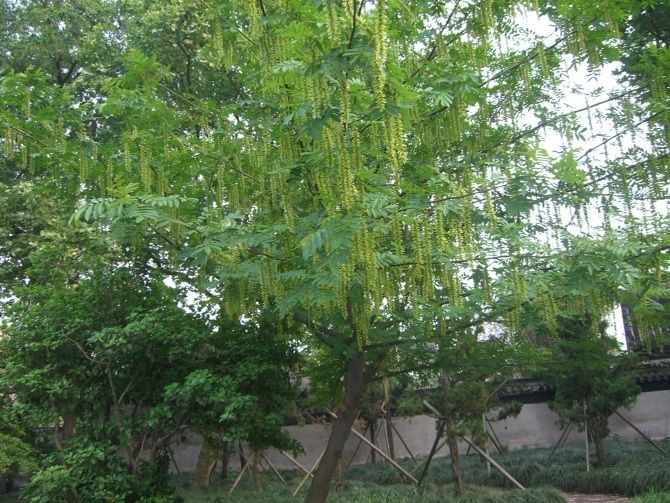
One corner (old)

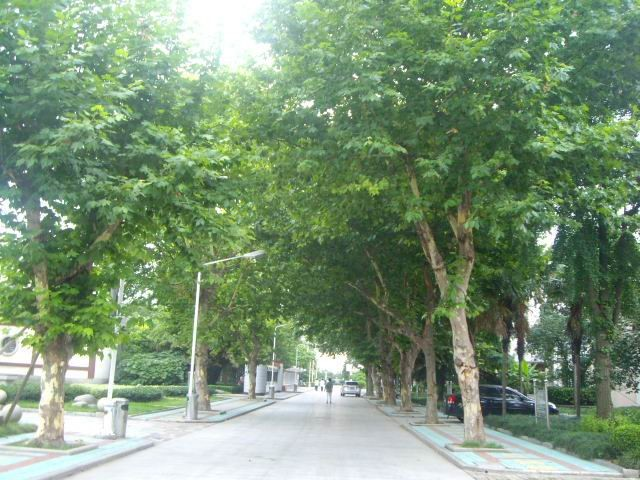
Main Road (old)

=== The new campus ===
The new campus was built in 2007, with great support from government. It is on the Sixian Road, Songling, the capital of Wujiang, with the square measure is about 246,700 square meters. There are different buildings for different usages. From east to west, there is one dining hall, six buildings of dorms, a gym, three teaching buildings, one building for administration, one library, one practical building for experiment, one art building and one assembly hall. At the east of the campus, lies the sport field, which belongs to government, while the school has the right to use it. Every year's school sport meeting is held in the field.

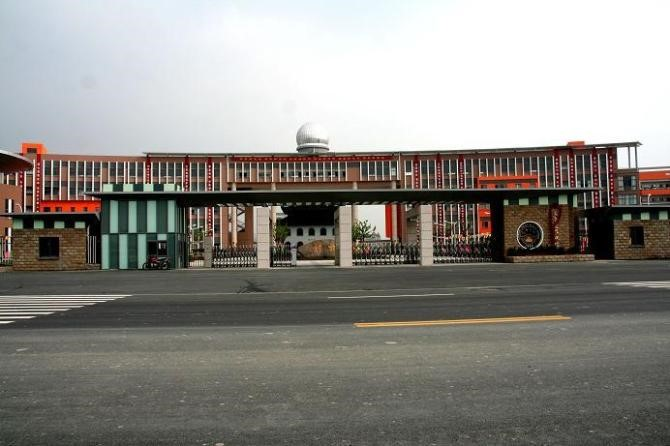
The school gate of the new compus

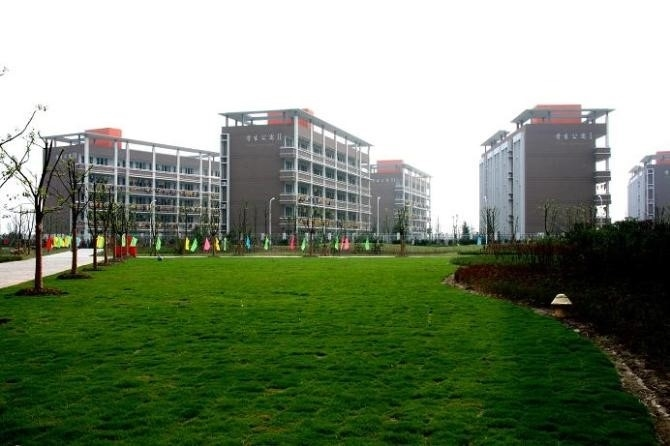
Teaching buildings (new)

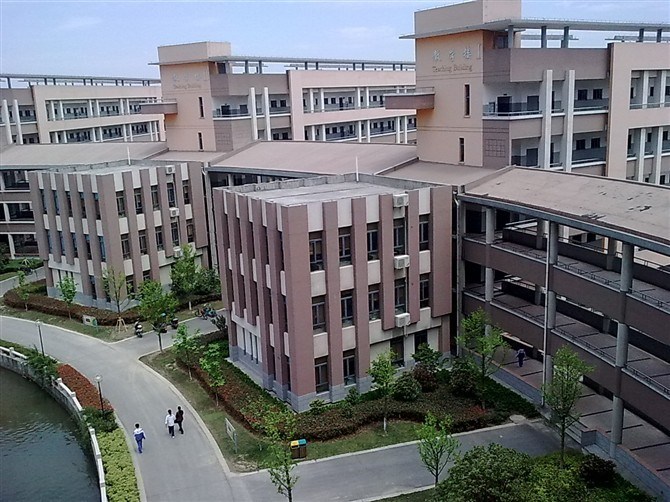
Teaching buildings (new)

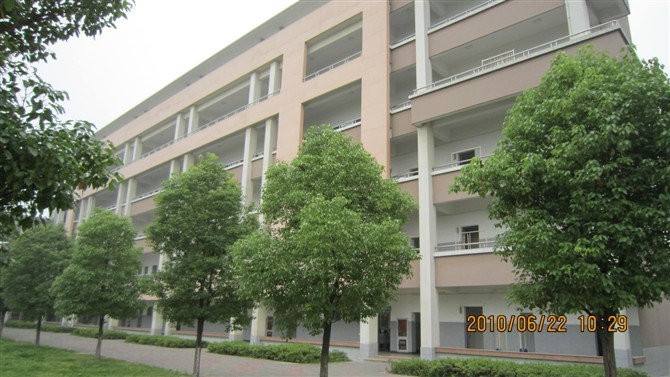
One of the teaching buildings on the new compus

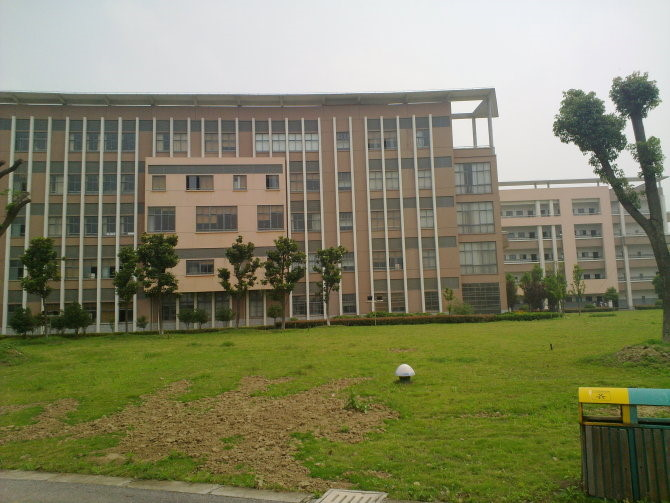
Building for Administration (new)

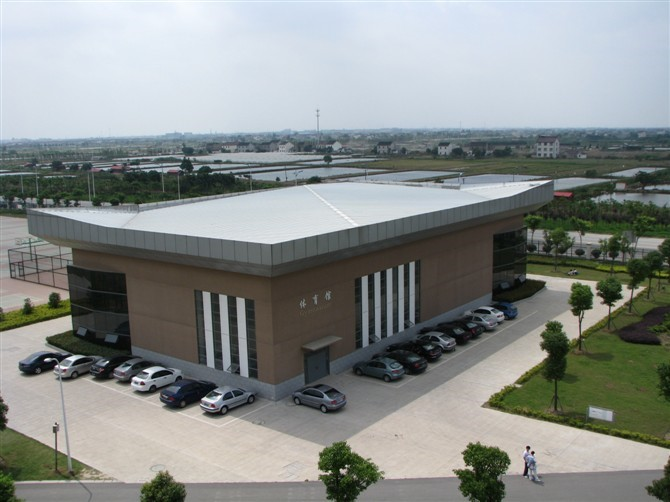
Gym (new)

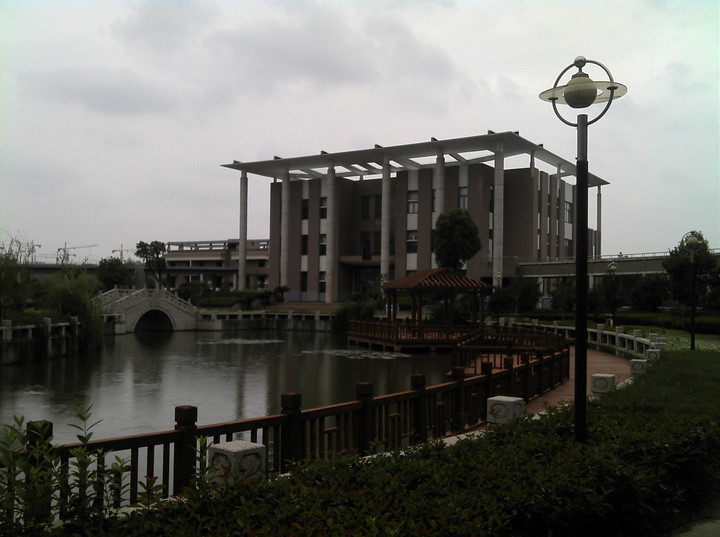
Practical Building (new)

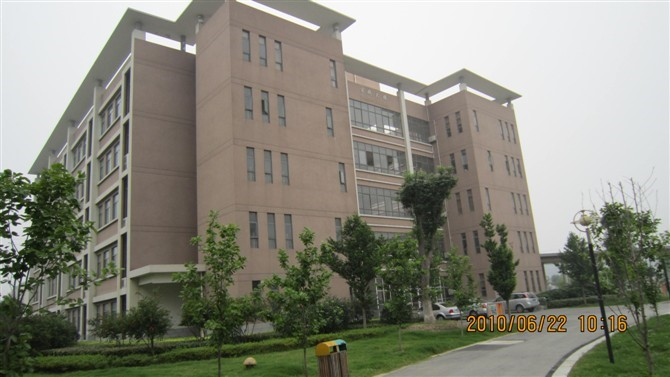
Practical Building (new)

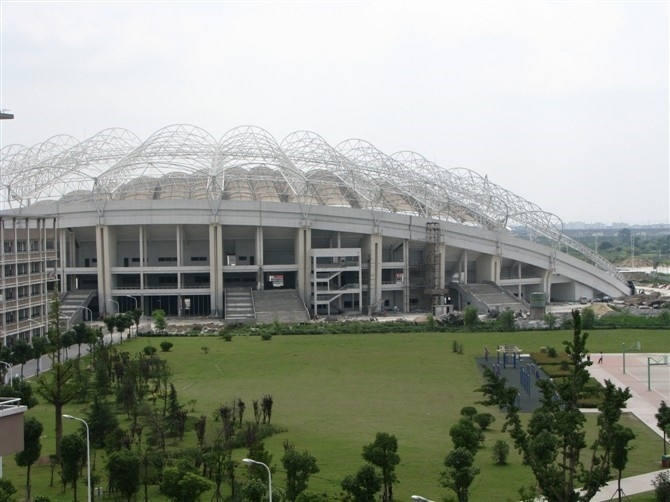
Sport Field (new)

== Spirit ==
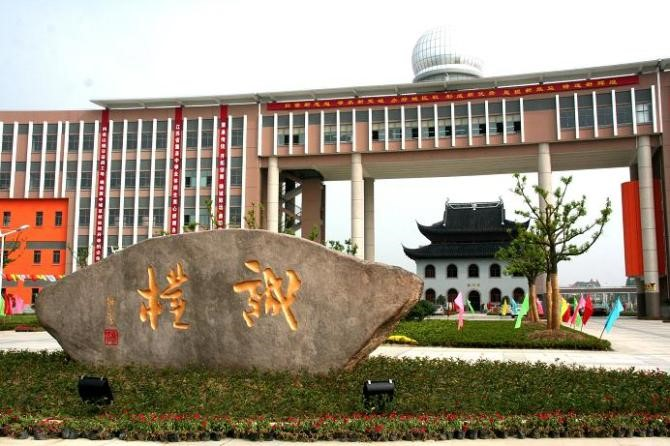
School Spirit

At the beginning of the school's establishment, the school spirit was fixed. The spirit has been lasting for more than 80 years until now. It is ‘Honesty and Simplicity’.

== Honors ==
Zhenze Middle School, Jiangsu Province, is one of four four-star middle schools in Wujiang. 9 students got the Scholarship of Li Zhengdao, 19 got the Scholarship of Tang Zhongying, and more than 50 got the Scholarship of Fei Xiaotong.

== Alumni and alumnae ==
- Yang Jiaxi (杨嘉墀; 1919–2006), one of the founding fathers of the project of two bombs and one satellite in 1950s and 1960s, an academician of Chinese Academy of Sciences, graduated in 1932.
- Wang Jiyang (汪集暘; 1935–), an expert in geothermics, an academician of Chinese Academy of Sciences, graduated in 1950.
- Zhuang Xiangming (庄祥鸣; 1944–), a rear admiral.
