= 1948 Pan-American Students Conference =

1948 student conference held in Colombia

The Pan-American Students Conference was a student conference held in Bogotá, Colombia, in April 1948. The conference was organized in opposition to the Pan-American Conference also held in Bogotá. The conference was attended by a young Fidel Castro.

On April 8 an organizational meeting in office of the Confederation of Workers of Colombia. A second meeting is claimed to have happened on April 9. Not long after that Gaitán was shot, leading to the Bogotazo.
