= Beijing No. 25 Middle School =

High school in Dongcheng, Beijing, China

- 北京市第二十五中学
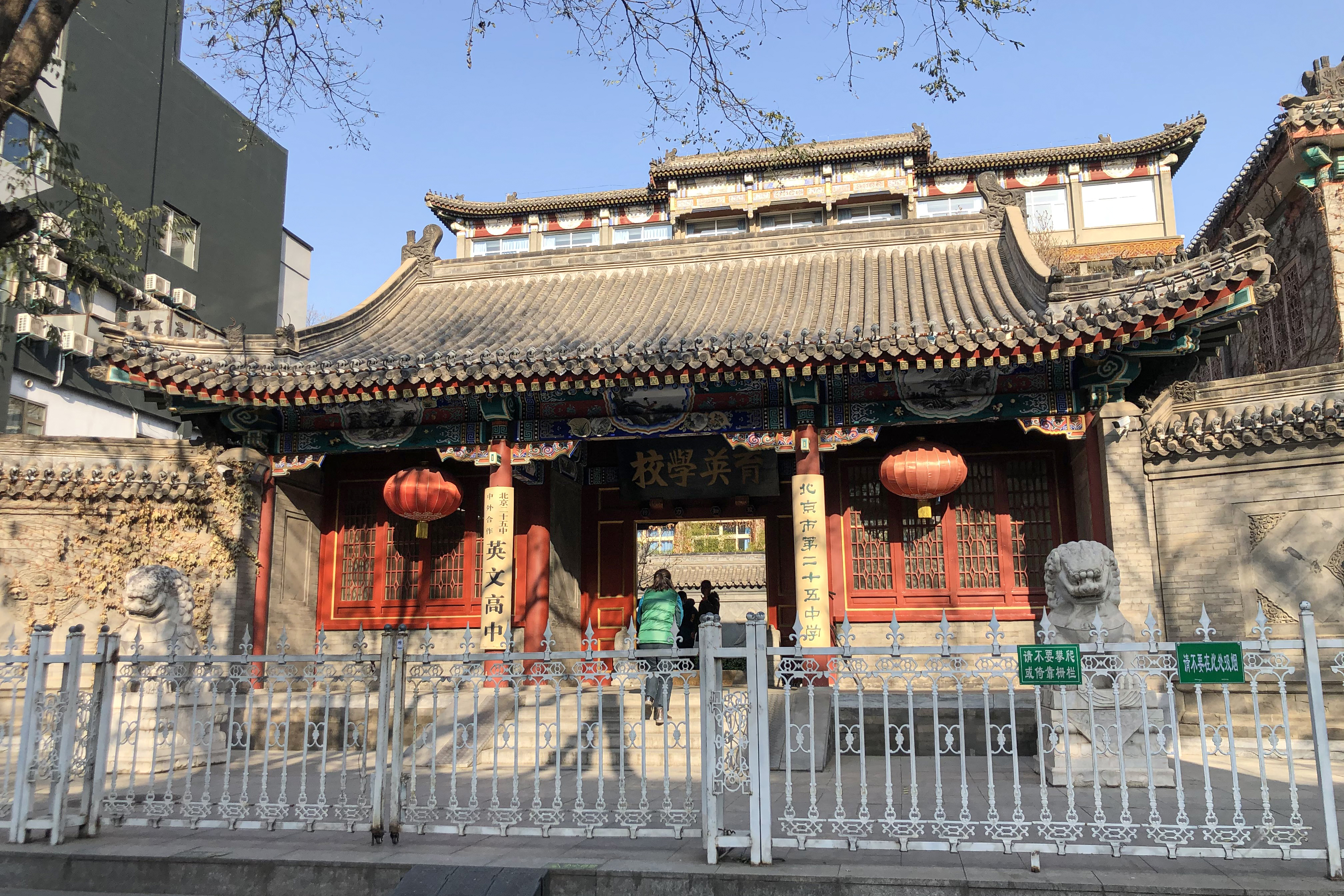
- School gate

Location
- 55 Dengshikou Street; Dongcheng District; Beijing, 100006; China; 39°55′05″N 116°24′24″E

Information
- Former name: Yuying School
- Type: Public secondary school
- Motto: 致知力行
- Established: 1864; 162 years ago
- Founder: American Congregational Church
- Grades: Junior and senior secondary
- Language: Chinese
- Website: https://www.bj25schooledu.com.cn/

Beijing No. 25 Middle School or Beijing No. 25 High School (Note: The Chinese word "中学" literally means "middle school" but refers to a combined lower secondary (middle school/junior high school) and upper secondary school (senior high school/sixth form college)) (Chinese: 北京市第二十五中学 "Beijing No. 25 Secondary School") is a junior high school and senior high school in Dongcheng District, Beijing, China. It includes a "Sino-Canadian" education program in which students graduate with both Chinese and Nova Scotia Canadian high school diplomas.

== History ==
The American Congregational Church established the Yu Ying School in 1864. In 2005 the school's Canadian Certified High School Program was established.

== Alumni ==
- Xi Jinping, paramount leader of China
- Liu Chuanzhi, Founder of Lenovo
- Sun Fuling, Vice Chairman of the Chinese People's Political Consultative Conference
