= Rolando Cubela Secades =

Cuban revolutionary leader (1933–2022)

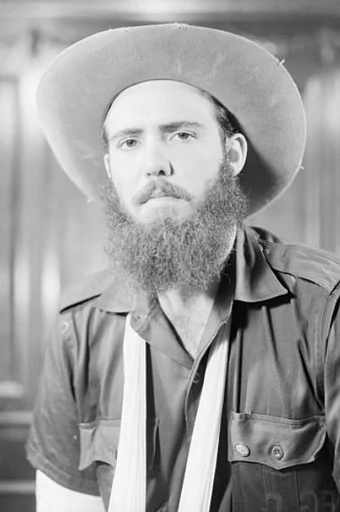
- Born: 19 January 1933; Cienfuegos, Cuba
- Died: 23 August 2022 (aged 89); Doral, Florida, U.S.
- Occupation: Revolutionary
- Known for: Directorio Revolucionario 13 de Marzo
- Notable work: Leader of the Escambray Front, CIA asset and attempted assassination of Fidel Castro
- Children: 2

Rolando Cubela Secades (19 January 1933 – 23 August 2022) was a Cuban revolutionary leader who played a vital part in the Cuban Revolution, having been a founding member of the Directorio Revolucionario 13 de Marzo and later the military leader of the DR's Escambray Mountain front, achieving the rank of Commander, the highest military rank in the Revolutionary Army. After the Revolution succeeded in 1959, Cubela became Cuba's envoy to UNESCO. Under the cryptonym AM/LASH, Cubela became "an important asset" of the Central Intelligence Agency, and worked with them on plots to assassinate Fidel Castro. In 1966, Cubela was arrested for plotting the assassination of Castro, and sentenced to 25 years in prison. Released in 1979, he went into exile in Spain.

== Career ==
Cubela was born in Cienfuegos, Cuba, on 19 January 1933, though many sources incorrectly cite 1932. In 1955 Cubela was a founding member of the Directorio Revolucionario 13 de Marzo (DR), and was one of eight members of its Executive Council. In 1956 Cubela was part of a DR group which attempted to assassinate Santiago Rey Perna, a member of President Fulgencio Batista's cabinet; Perna was absent at the time of the attack and the group instead assassinated Antonio Blanco Rico, head of Cuban military intelligence. The incident prompted Chief of National Police Rafael Salas Canizares to assault the Haitian embassy in Havana, where some revolutionaries were seeking political asylum; Canizares and ten revolutionaries were killed. After the assassination, Cubela went into exile in the United States in late 1956, returning to Cuba in 1958.

In mid-1958, Cubela was disputing leadership of the Directorio Revolucionario 13 de Marzo with Eloy Gutiérrez Menoyo. Menoyo had developed the Escambray Mountain front which was the center of DR activity after the failed March 1957 coup attempt in Havana; but Menoyo had joined the DR more recently whilst Cubela was a founding member. Cubela was ultimately recognized as DR military leader, and Menoyo left the organization. Menoyo formed the Segundo Frente del Escambray, a group that continued the fight against Batista. Years later, after the triumph of the Revolution, many of the Segundo Frente members fought against the new regime of Fidel Castro. Cubela leading the DR was wounded in the Battle of Santa Clara.

After the Cuban Revolution, Cubela was appointed Deputy Secretary in the Ministry of Government in 1959, and in October was elected head of the Federación Estudiantíl Universitaria. Cubela made significant contributions in the early months of the revolutionary government to the reconciliation of the different revolutionary groups, and in 1960 to the merger of various youth and student groups. In summer 1960, Cubela met an old friend, Carlos Tepedino, who was by then working for the CIA under the cryptonym AMWHIP. After Cuban leader Fidel Castro had – in Cubela's view – betrayed the revolution and established a communist dictatorship, Cubela became disenchanted and started plotting with the CIA and other opponents of the Castro regime to try to end Castro's government and return to a non-socialist course for the country.

Cubela later became "an important asset" of the Central Intelligence Agency under the cryptonym AM/LASH, and worked with them on plots to assassinate Fidel Castro. In October 1963, Cubela met with Desmond Fitzgerald, head of the CIA's Special Affairs Staff, in Paris, over the objections of some SAS staff who considered Cubela a possible dangle or at least a security risk. At another Paris meeting, on 22 November 1963, Cubela received a "poison pen" – a fountain pen with a hypodermic needle to be used to inject Castro with a poison. Nevertheless, Cubela was insisting on a meeting with US Attorney General Robert Kennedy before proceeding with the assassination of Castro. The CIA cautious of "plausible deniability" stalled. In June 1965, however, the Agency terminated its relationship with Cubela "for reasons related to security". They had been tipped off by the Cuban exile Eladio del Valle that Cubela was in contact with the mafia boss Santo Trafficante Jr. who he had discussed the Castro assassination plots with. The CIA suspected Trafficante may have been passing on information to Castro.

On 28 February 1966, Castro summoned Cubela to his office, and had him arrested for plotting to kill the head of state. The prosecution did not refer to Cubela's pre-1964 CIA contacts or activities, including the 1963 poison pen episode, limiting evidence to 1964–5 activities. After Castro petitioned the court to avoid the death penalty, Cubela was sentenced to 25 years in prison. After his pardon by Castro and his release in 1979, he went into exile to Spain, and became a physician. He spent the last years of his life in Miami, Florida, where he did not participate in the political activities of the Cuban exile community.

He died on 24 August 2022 at a hospital in Doral, Florida, United States.

== In fiction ==
Cubela appears in Che (2008), played by different actors in parts one and two. He also features in Norman Mailer's Harlot's Ghost.

== See also ==
- Faure Chomón
- Directorio Revolucionario 13 de Marzo
- José Antonio Echeverría
- Eloy Gutiérrez Menoyo
- Havana Presidential Palace attack (1957)
- Humboldt 7 massacre
- Presidential Palace
- Radiocentro CMQ Building
