= Faure Chomón =

Cuban historian and politician (1929–2019)

Faure Chomón Mediavilla
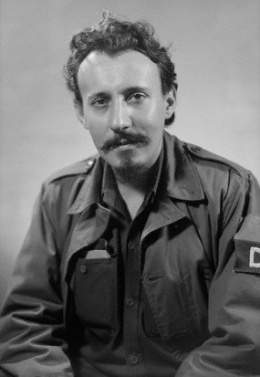
- Born: 15 January 1929; Manatí, Cuba
- Died: 5 December 2019 (aged 90); Havana, Cuba
- Occupations: Revolutionary, politician, historian
- Known for: founding the Directorio Revolucionario 13 de Marzo
- Notable work: El Ataque al Palacio Presidential

Faure Chomón Mediavilla (15 January 1929 – 5 December 2019) was a Cuban historian and politician. He was one of the founding members and leaders of the Directorio Revolucionario 13 de Marzo. After the triumph of the Revolution he joined Fidel Castro's government. Early in his career, he served as the Secretary of Communication and Transportation and Ambassador to the Soviet Union. Later he served as Ambassador to Vietnam and Ecuador as well as historian of the Revolution. He was also member of the National Assembly of People's Power from 1976 to his death.

He was born in Manatí, 45 km north of the city of Las Tunas. He began as a student leader in the Federation of University Students (FEU). As members of the Revolutionary Directorate, on 13 March 1957, during the dictatorship of Fulgencio Batista, he led, together with Carlos Gutiérrez Menoyo, the revolutionary group made up of 50 men that carried out the assault on the Presidential Palace, where he was seriously injured. He was part of the Las Villas Front under the command of Ernesto Guevara.

Once the revolution triumphed, Faure was recognized with the honorific rank of comandante in the armed forces.

He died on 5 December 2019 in Havana, due to multiple organ dysfunction syndrome.

== See also ==
- Directorio Revolucionario 13 de Marzo
- Havana Presidential Palace attack (1957)
- Humboldt 7 massacre
- Radiocentro CMQ Building
- Presidential Palace
- José Antonio Echeverría
- Eloy Gutiérrez Menoyo
- Rolando Cubela Secades
