= Havana Presidential Palace attack (1957) =

1957 assassination attempt during the Cuban Revolution

Coordinates: 23°08′30″N 82°21′24″W

1957 Havana Presidential Palace attack
- Part of the Cuban Revolution
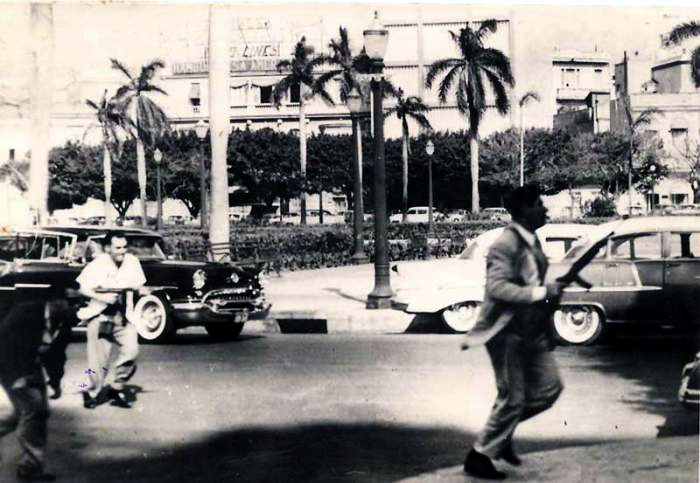
- Armed DR militants advancing through the streets during the attack
- Date: 13 March 1957
- Location: Havana, Cuba
- Goals: Assassinate Batista
- Methods: Surprise attack
- Result: Cuban military victory: DRE militants repelled; DRE leader José Antonio Echeverría killed; Batista unharmed by assassination attempt

Parties
Group of Auténticos; Directorio Revolucionario	Cuban police Presidential Palace guards

Lead figures
Menelao Mora Morales (Chief) †; Carlos Gutiérrez Menoyo †; José Antonio Echeverría †; Faure Chomón Mediavilla; Ignacio Gonzalez	Fulgencio Batista

Number
46	Unknown number of police 100 presidential guards

Casualties
- Deaths: 26 militants 6 presidential guards and policemen
- Arrested: 2
- Detained: 2
- Charged: 2

The 1957 Havana Presidential Palace attack was a failed assassination attempt on the life of President Fulgencio Batista at the Presidential Palace in Havana, Cuba. The attack began at around 3:30 pm on March 13, 1957, carried out by Menelao Mora, a group of members of the Partido Auténtico, and the student opposition group Directorio Revolucionario 13 de Marzo, but was unsuccessful in its goal of killing Batista. According to one of the group's founding members, Faure Chomón, they were following the golpe arriba strategy and sought to overthrow the government by killing Batista.

The same day, a similar attack occurred at the Radio Reloj at the Radiocentro CMQ Building. The plan was to announce Batista's death over Radio Reloj; however, this attack also failed.

== Attack ==
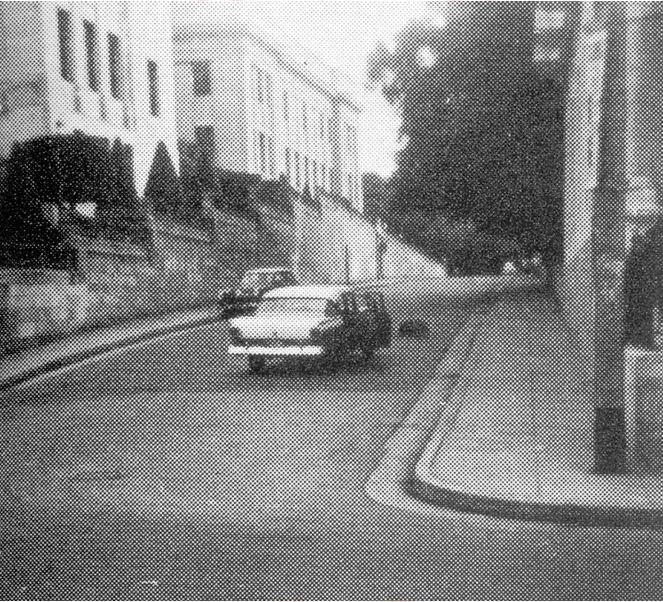
Car used by José Antonio Echeverría left abandoned in the road following the attack on the Presidential Palace.

The plan of attack, as explained by Faure Chomón Mediavilla, was to secure the Presidential Palace by a commando of fifty men (46 participated) and simultaneously support the operation by one hundred men occupying the radio station Radio Reloj at the Radiocentro CMQ Building to announce the death of Batista. The attack on the palace would result in the elimination of Fulgencio Batista.

=== Presidential Palace attack ===
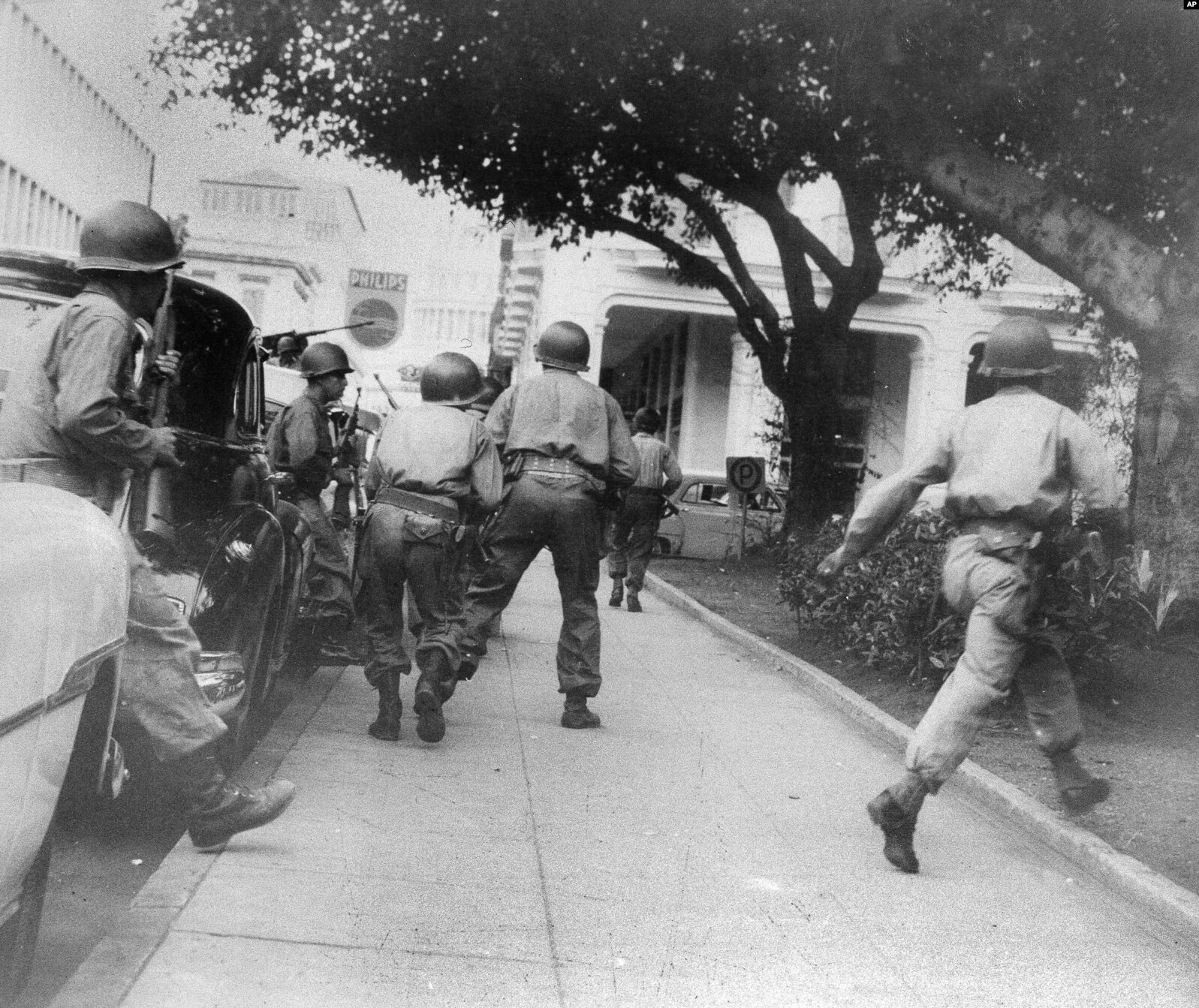
Soldiers approach the Presidential Palace. March 13, 1957.

At 3:40 pm, the main assault force arrived before the main entrance to the Presidential Palace in two sedans and a delivery truck. They were armed with rifles, submachine guns, pistols, and grenades. All were in shirtsleeves for identification, since suits or uniforms were required for persons within the palace.

Twelve government soldiers on guard at the entrance were shot or scattered. Of the 46 attackers, nine were able to reach the second floor of the east wing of the palace, about ten were shot down in the open area before the building and the remainder occupied part of the ground floor. The palace switchboard was disabled with a grenade.

Batista's office on the third floor was reached by a group of the rebel force and two of his guards were killed near his desk. Batista himself had retreated to the presidential suite on the top floor where the palace defenders rallied and fired on the attackers both within the palace and the forecourt below. At this point military and police reinforcements arrived while tanks were summoned. The rebels within the palace were forced to retreat, some being killed on the main staircase. Only three escaped the building.

The main assault force was to be supported by a group of 100 armed men who would occupy the tallest buildings in the surrounding area of the Presidential Palace (La Tabacalera, the Sevilla Hotel, the Palace of Fine Arts) and, from these positions, support the main force. However, this secondary support operation was not carried out as the militants assigned to capture the buildings hesitated and did not arrive.

The attackers spoke in code to frustrate a potential infiltration or a divulging of the attack in any conversation. It had been agreed early on that they would refer to the palace as "la casa de los tres kilos." (Note: The house of the three cents.)

Although the attackers reached the third floor of the palace, they did not locate or harm Batista.

=== Radio Reloj attack ===
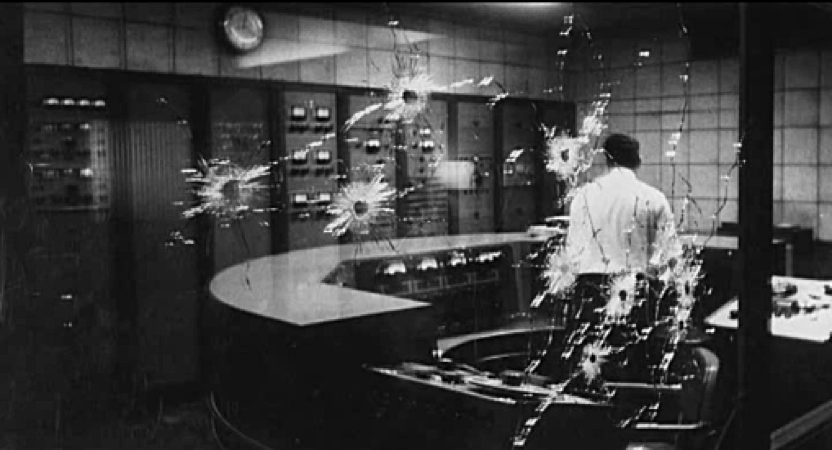
Bullet holes in glass at the Radiocentro CMQ Building

The attack at Radio Reloj, located in the Radiocentro CMQ Building at Calle 23 and L in El Vedado, was led by José Antonio Echeverría who was accompanied among others, by Fructuoso Rodríguez, Joe Westbrook, Raúl Diaz Argüelles, and Julio García Olivera. The group departed from a basement apartment located on Calle 19 between Calles B and C towards the Radiocentro CMQ Building in three automobiles, including a delivery truck. At 3:21 PM on March 13, 1957, José Antonio arrived at Radio Reloj and after being announced, read a prepared statement over the radio, announcing Batista's death despite that such an event had not actually happened.

"People of Cuba, in these moments the dictator Fulgencio Batista has just been justified. In his own burrow of the Presidential Palace, the people of Cuba have come to settle accounts. And it is we, the Revolutionary Directory, who in the name of the Cuban Revolution have given the shot of grace to this regime of opprobrium. Cubans listening to me. It's just been removed..."

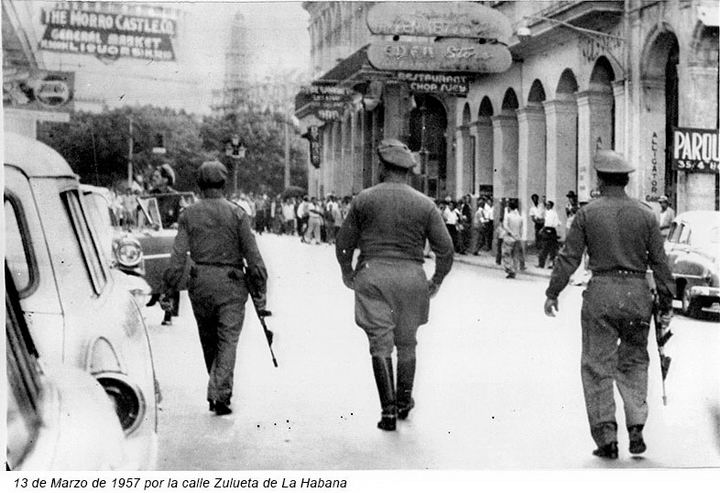
Havana Police officers armed with automatic weapons after the attack

The operation failed, Batista was never killed, and the troops guarding the Radio Reloj transmission tower in Arroyo Arenas had knocked down the transmission. José Antonio was shot and killed by police on the corner of November 27 and L, on his way back to the university.

Otto Hernández Fernández, the last survivor of the Radio Reloj attack, recalled the events:

"The assailants went out in three cars to Radio Reloj. Carlos Figueredo traveled as our driver, Fructuoso Rodríguez, José Antonio Echeverría, Joe Westbrook and myself. According to our plan, Echeverría was the only one that had to reach the door of the CMQ station building. The other two had the mission of closing the street in each corner to avoid interruptions. They entered the building with authority. While they went up to the transmission booth, the driver concentrated on preventing the car from going out, and I went out with the machine gun to ensure the return without mishap. About five minutes later I see that the doorman starts to close a large glass door. While Figueredo shoots twice from his seat, I go to the entrance of CMQ, I point (my gun) at the guard and I say "do not close, because if you do I'll open it up with bullets." That man was paralyzed, but he did not continue. Just a moment later José Antonio and the others come down. They had cut the transmission and did not finish reading the message. When we passed the corner of Jovellar and L we felt the siren of a police car after us. Right there I told the Chinese Figueredo to keep quiet and let the patrol pass. Well, he started like a fireball and rammed the police car almost head-on. With the crash, I fell to the ground, but I remember how José Antonio had the impulse to open the door shooting at the cops. Even today I have very clear in my memory the fat man falling almost in front of us."

=== Casualties ===
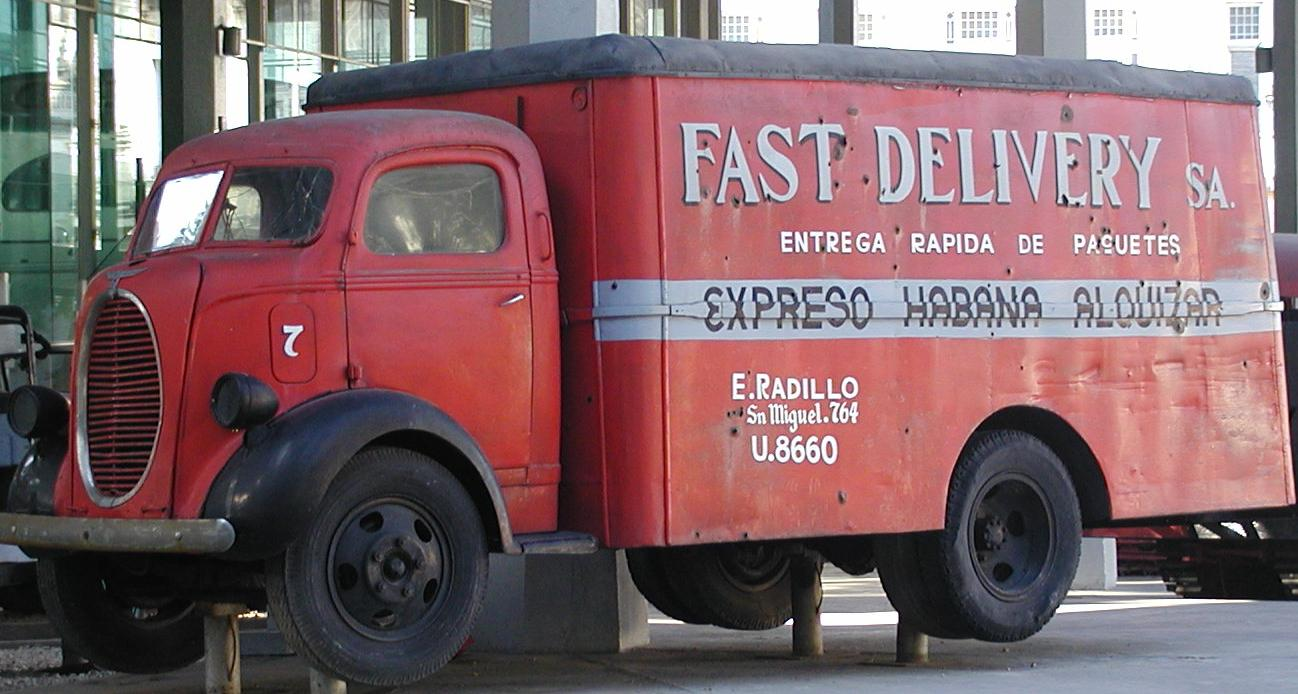
The delivery truck used by the attackers

Twenty of the 100 members of Batista's presidential guard were killed. Forty-two rebels participated in the attack against the palace; 34 were from the Partido Autentico, and the rest were from the Student Directory.

Killed at the Presidential Palace were Menelao Mora Morales, 52, Carlos Gutíerrez Menoyo (brother of Eloy Gutiérrez Menoyo), 34, José Luis Gómez Wangüemert, 31, José Briñas Garcia, 26, Ubaldo (Waldo) Diaz Fuentes, 28, Abelardo Rodriguez Mederos, 30 (driver of one of the cars), José Castellanos Valdes, (alias "Ventrecha"), 35, Evelio Prieto Guillaume, 33, Adolfo Delgado, Eduardo Panizo Bustos, 32, Pedro Esperon, 45, Reinaldo León Llera, 39, Norberto Hernández Nodal, 45, Pedro Nulasco Monzón, 30, Pedro Tellez Valdes, 37, Mario Casañas Díaz, 28, Asterlo Enls Masa de Armas, 25, Gerardo Medina Candentey, Carlos Manuel Pérez Domingues, 45, Angel Salvador González González, 54, Adolfo Raúl Delgado Rodriguez, 29, Ramón Alraro Betancourt, 36, Celestino Pacheco, Eduardo Domingues Aguilar, 50, Pedro Zayden Rivera, 25, Luis Felipe Almeida Hernandez, 35, José Hernández, Salvador Alfaro, and Ormani Arenado Llonch.

Killed at Radio Reloj were José Azef, Aestor Bombino, José Antonio Echevarria, Otto Hernandez, and Pedro Martinez Brito.

Surviving the attack were Angel Eros, Amador Silveriño (driver of the "Fast Delivery" truck.), Orlando Manrique, Orlando Lamadrid Velazco, Sergio Pereda Velazco, Santiago Aguero, Manuel Toranzo, Ricardo Olmedo (injured during attack; later shot for attempting to kill Fidel Castro), 40, Faure Chomón, Antonio Castell Valdes, Juan Gualberto Valdes, José M. Olivera, Marcos Leonel Remigio González, Juan José Alfonso Zuñiga, Evelio Álvarez, and Luís Goicochea.

== Aftermath ==
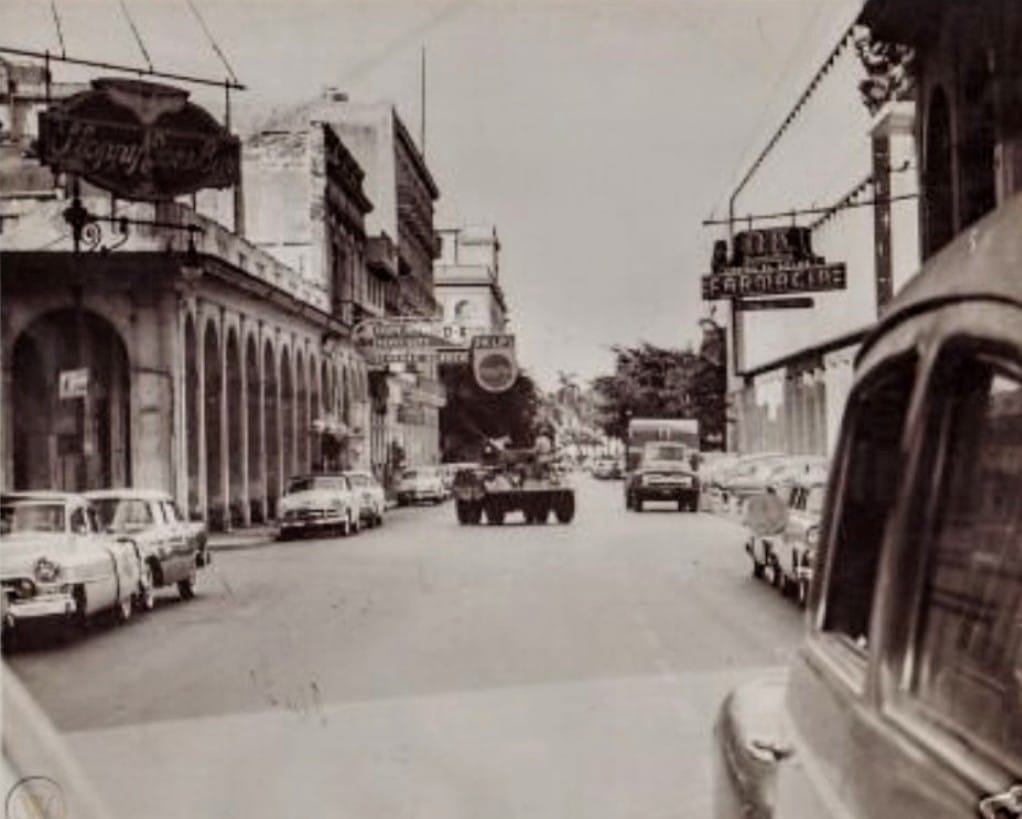
Cuban army vehicle on Calle Zulueta immediately after the attack at Presidential Palace

The Havana Urgency court announced there would be a trial on April 5, 1957, for those charged in the March 13 attacks. Two individuals were under arrest to be tried: Orlando Olmedo Moreno, wounded during the attack, and Efrain Alfonso Liriano. All others connected with the attack either escaped or were killed.

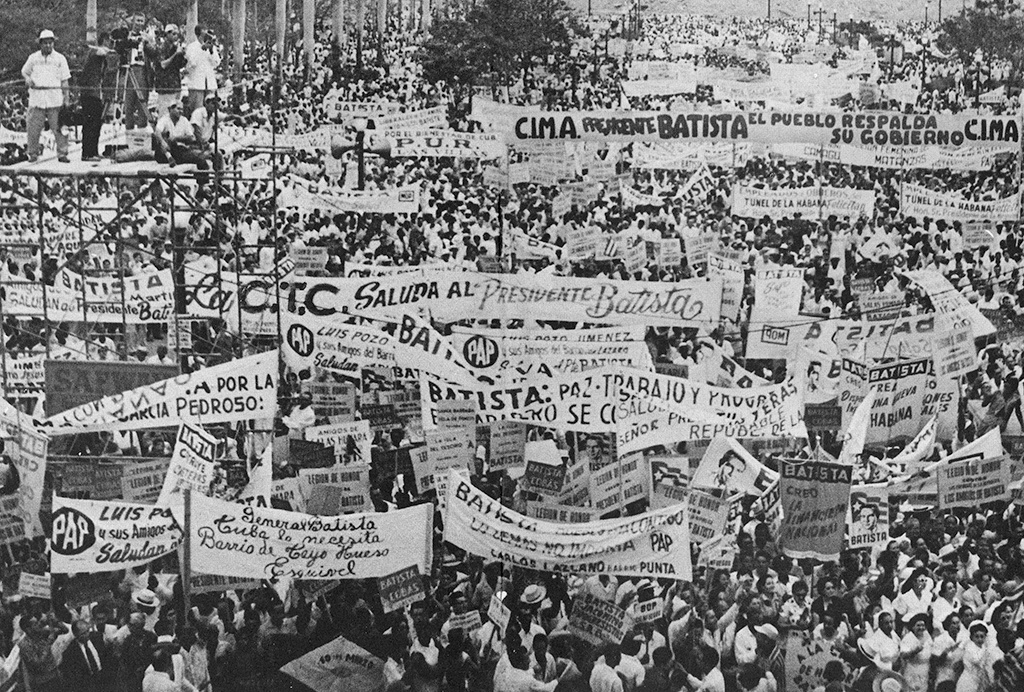
Batista supporters at the public act of redress, April 7, 1957

=== Public Act of Redress ===
The public act of redress by the people of Havana for the assault of March 13 on the Presidential Palace took place on April 7, 1957. It was reported that more than 250,000 people attended.

By R. Hart Phillips

Special to the New York Times. HAVANA, April 7—Thousands of persons marched to the Presidential Palace this afternoon to signify their support of President Fulgencio Batista. Representatives of labor, commerce, industry, Government, political parties and supporters of the Administration filled the park in front of the palace and all adjacent streets. Placards and banners carried by the marchers proclaimed approval of General Batista's policies, his public works program and his efforts to suppress the revolutionary activities of his enemies. One large banner said, "For Batista, in the Past, Now and Forever." Another read "Five Hundred American Residents of the Isle of Pines Have Faith in Batista." The keynote of the demonstration was "Peace." Flocks of white doves were released during the demonstration to signify a demand for peace. Precautionary measures were taken by the government to protect the demonstrators. Policemen armed with rifles surrounded the palace. On all near-by roofs policemen and soldiers armed with rifles and machine guns were on duty.

=== Golpeando Arriba ===
On January 22, 1959, Fidel Castro explained to journalists gathered in the Copa Room of the Havana Riviera hotel, among other topics, that hitting up, "golpear arriba," was one of the "false concepts about the revolution" because "tyranny is not a man; tyranny is a system (...) We were never supporters of tyrannicide or military coups, [which tended] to inculcate the people a complex of impotence " A few months earlier Castro had reprimanded Guevara for having signed a pact with Rolando Cubela, Chomon's lieutenant in the DR-13-3 guerrilla in Escambray mountains, the "Pacto del Pedrero". The letter is dated in Palma Soriano on December 26, 1958; part of it reads:

"You are committing a serious political error by sharing your authority, your prestige and your strength with the Revolutionary Directorate. There is no sense in raising a small group whose intentions and ambitions we know so well, and which in the future will be a source of problems "

=== Humboldt 7 massacre ===
The failure of the attacks led to a widespread police crackdown on anti-Batista militants, often involving extrajudicial killings of revolutionaries, regardless of whether they were armed or fighting back. On April 20, 1957, four unarmed DRE revolutionaries who were previously involved in the attack were shot and killed by Havana police as they attempted to flee their apartment safehouse during a raid. The event led to widespread criticism of the police and, after the revolution, resulted in the arrest, trial and execution (1964) of Marcos Rodriguez (Marquitos), another revolutionary who betrayed the four men.

== See also ==
- Humboldt 7 massacre
- Radiocentro CMQ Building
- Presidential Palace
- Directorio Revolucionario 13 de Marzo
- Faure Chomón
- José Antonio Echeverría
- Rolando Cubela Secades
- Eloy Gutiérrez Menoyo

== Additional reading ==
Attack on the Presidential Palace (March 13, 1957)
