= José Antonio Echeverría =

Cuban revolutionary (1932–1957)

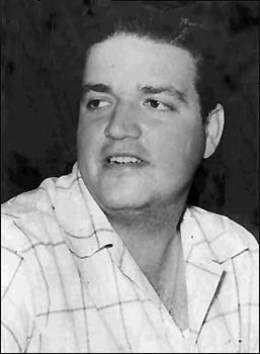
- Born: José Antonio Jesús del Carmen Echeverría Bianchi; July 16, 1932; Cárdenas, Cuba
- Died: March 13, 1957 (aged 24); Havana, Cuba
- Cause of death: Gunshot wounds
- Occupation: Revolutionary
- Known for: Directorio Revolucionario 13 de Marzo
- Notable work: Havana Presidential Palace attack (1957)

José Antonio Echeverría Bianchi (July 16, 1932 – March 13, 1957) was a Cuban prominent figure in the Cuban Revolution against President Fulgencio Batista. Echeverría was the President of the University Student Federation (Federación Estudiantil Universitaria – FEU) and a founding member of the militant organization Directorio Revolucionario 13 de Marzo. He is known for his role in the attack on the Presidential Palace and the Radio Reloj radio station of Cuba. Echeverría's nickname was "Manzanita," which means "Little Apple".

== Early life and education ==
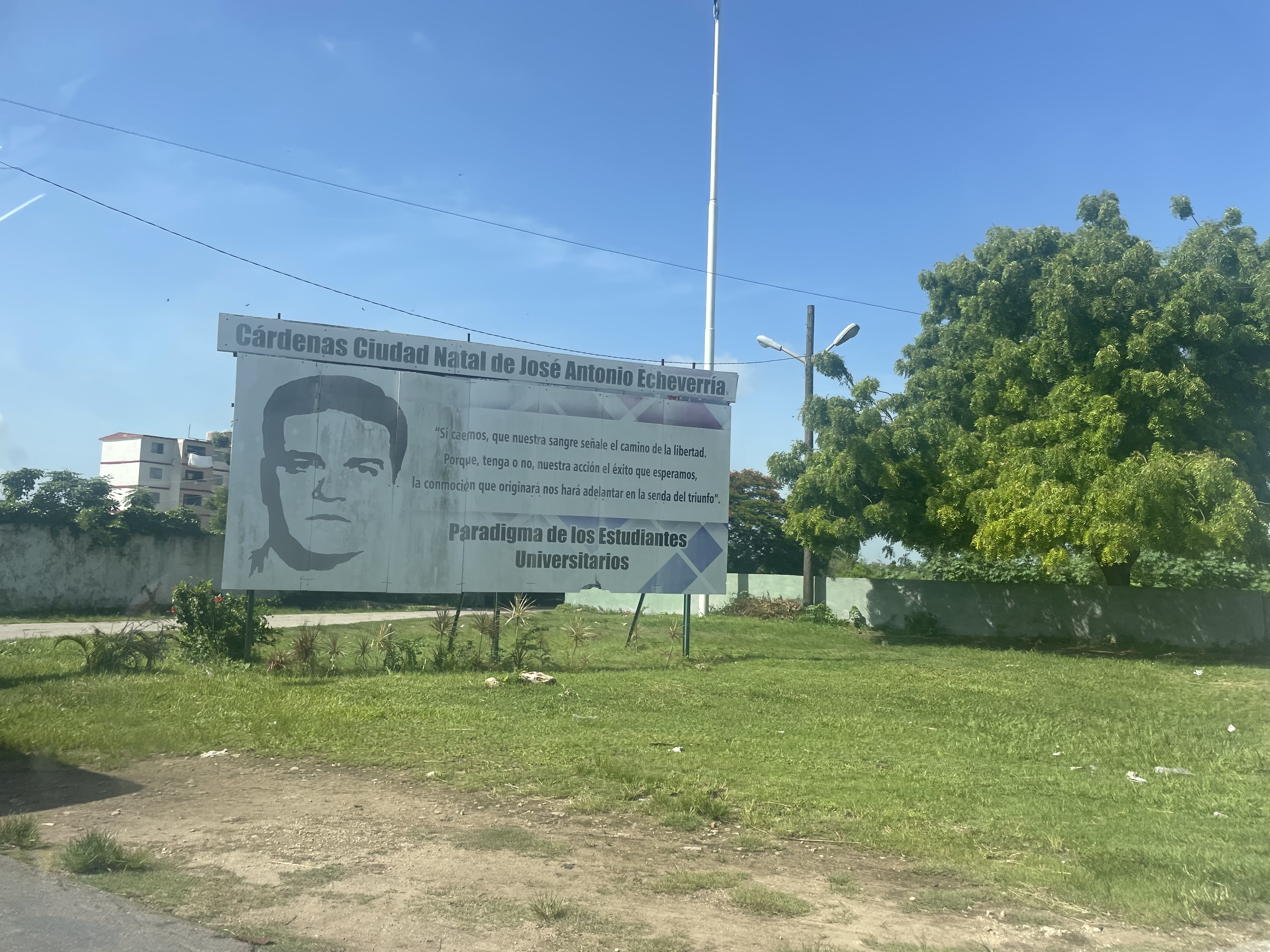
Sign seen when entering Cárdenas, the birth city of José Antonio Echeverría

Echeverría was born to Antonio Jesús Echeverría González and Concepción Bianchi Tristán in Cárdenas, Matanzas, Cuba. He had three younger siblings named Sinforiano, Alfredo, and Lucía. Echeverría attended Champagnat primary school, belonging to the Congregation of the Marist Brothers, and he later graduated with a Bachelor of Science degree from the Secondary Education Institute of Cárdenas in 1950.

Echeverría enrolled in the School of Architecture at the University of Havana in August 1950. He chose architecture for his love of mathematics and drawing. In Havana, Echeverría lived in several guest houses, private homes that rented rooms at affordable prices for students and people from the interior of the country.

== Activism and leadership ==
In March 1952, Echeverría joined the student protests against the coup led by Fulgencio Batista. On March 14, he signed the Declaration of Principles of the University Student Federation. Echeverría became the president of the FEU in September 1954, after the vice president resigned, and the acting president, Benigno Arbezú, graduated. During his presidency, Echeverría strengthened and developed the student fight against the dictatorship. He also promoted solidarity with the economic problems of Latin America and support for their social and political struggles. Echeverría promoted cultural life on the university campus, with the celebration of the University Symphony Week and exhibitions by important artists such as Wifredo Lam and Girona. He organized cycles of conferences, performances by the Alicia Alonso Ballet and presentations by the Philharmonic Orchestra of Havana and the University Theatre.

== Revolutionary activities and death ==
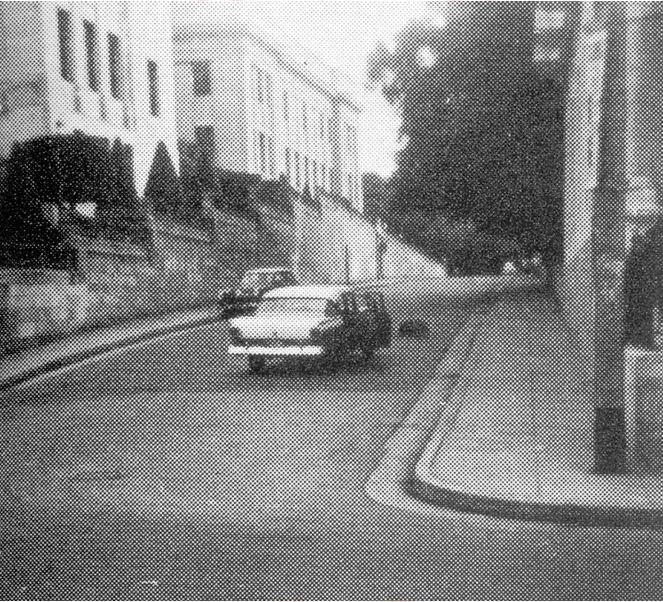
Echeverría's car at the University of Havana shortly before he was killed, March 13, 1957

Echeverría was a founding member of the DR, a militant organization that played an important role in the Cuban Revolution. He was part of the Presidential Palace attack and also took a leading role in the attack on the Radio Reloj station that ultimately led to his death.

During the attack on the Radio Reloj station on March 13, 1957, Echeverría gave an anti-Batista speech that was broadcast to the Cuban nation. He estimated that the rioters could only occupy the radio station for three minutes, so he had to prepare a speech that lasted three minutes at most. Echeverría managed to finish his speech at the 181st second and left the station unharmed. On the way to the University of Havana, he opened fire on a police patrol and was killed during the shootout on the footpath at the north side of the university. A memorial plaque now stands at the site.

== Funeral ==
To prevent a public funeral and potential protests, the Batista regime kept Echeverria's body in the morgue until the afternoon of March 14. At that point, the family, who had been in Havana since the day of Echeverria's death, was finally given the body. Around 6 pm, the regime authorized the transfer of the coffin to Cárdenas, but with strict conditions: only the parents' car could accompany the hearse, and the rest of the procession had to depart immediately and wait at Calzada de Managua, El Calvario, Arroyo Naranjo. Additionally, it was suggested that the coffin be taken directly to the cemetery in Cárdenas.

During the funeral procession, authorities stopped and searched the procession several times. Upon arriving at Calzada, they were ordered to proceed directly to the cemetery, which was surrounded by police and agents of the Military Intelligence Service, a repressive body of the dictatorship. Under the orders of Captain Alzugaray, the chief of police in the area, cars and individuals were searched. Captain Alzugaray was later executed in a summary trial after the triumph of the Revolution.

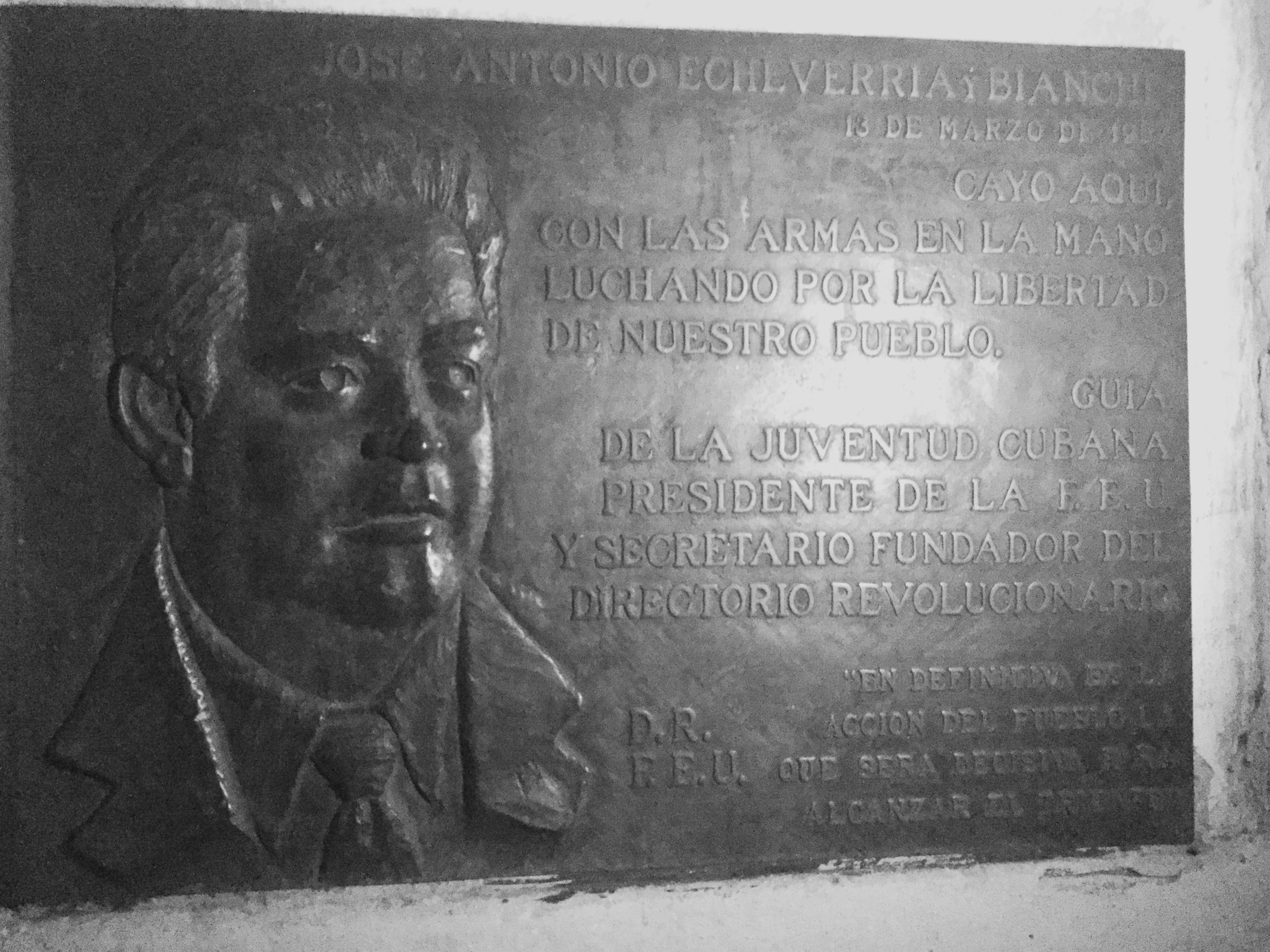
Echeverría memorial plaque on the north side of the University of Havana

== Legacy ==
Echeverría's speech at the Radio Reloj station was mentioned in the poem "Three Minutes of Truth" written by the Soviet-Russian poet Yevgeny Yevtushenko. The Vietnamese writer Phùng Quán also wrote:

"The story about Manzana teaches me a great lesson about language arts. Even the greatest topics like reality or truth could be expressed only in 180 seconds, on condition that the author has to use his life to pay for such invaluable time."

== See also ==
- Eloy Gutiérrez Menoyo
- Faure Chomón
- Humboldt 7 massacre
- Museum of the Revolution (Cuba)
- Radiocentro CMQ Building
- Rolando Cubela Secades

== Gallery ==
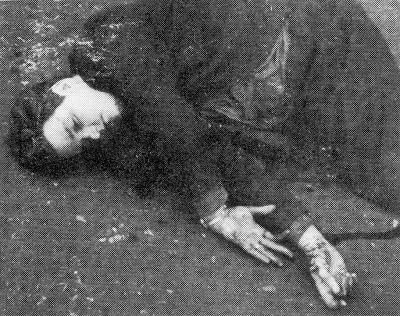
Jose Antonio Echevarria. Dead on March 13, 1957.

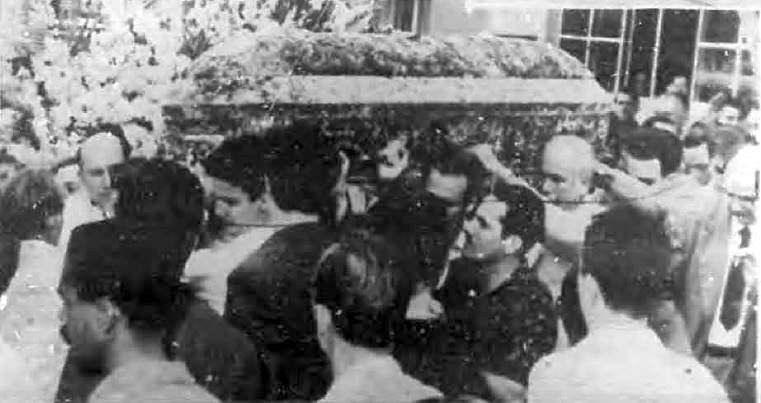
Antonio Echevarria funeral. Havana, 1957.

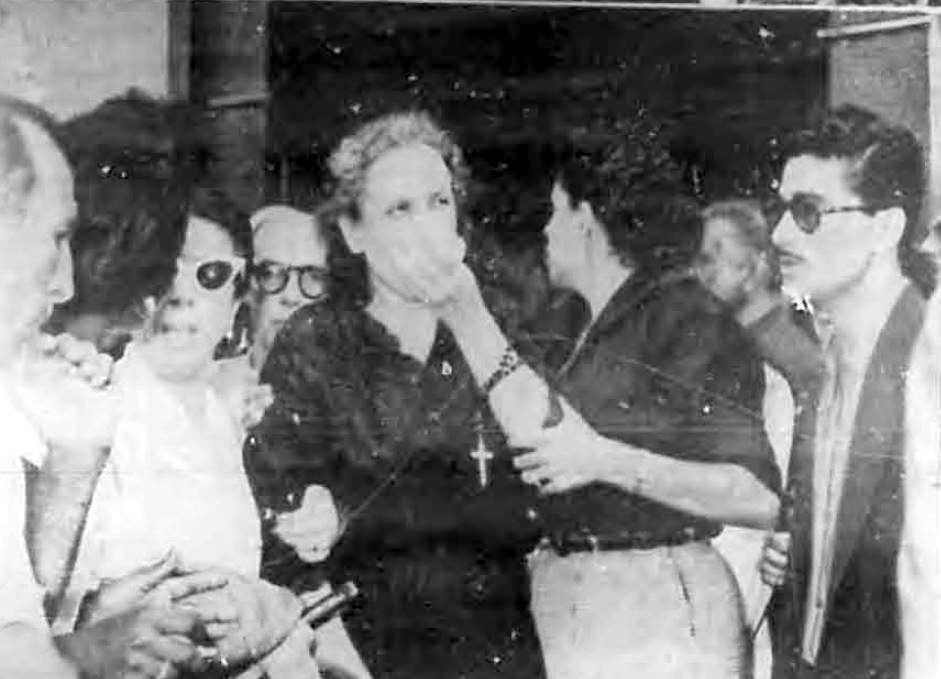
Antonio Echevarria's mother. Havana, 1957.

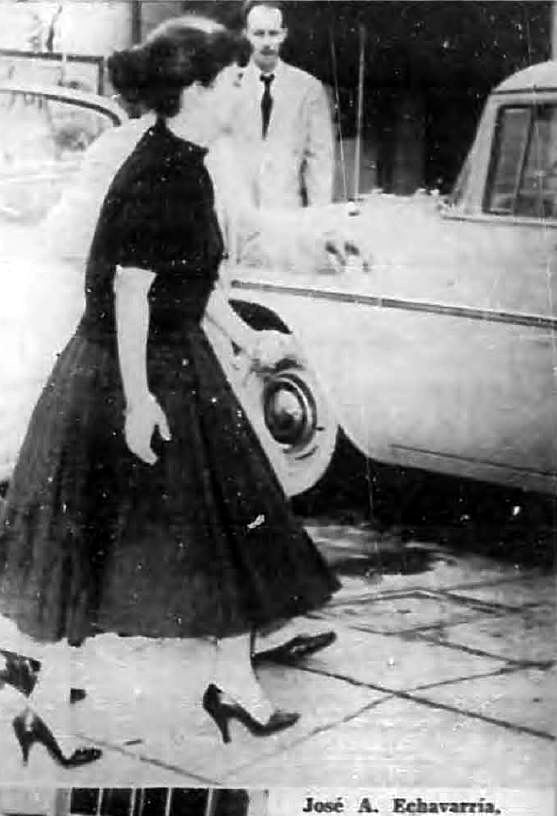
Antonio Echevarria's girlfriend days after the attack. Havana, 1957.

=== Bibliography ===
- Quirk, Robert E. (1993). Fidel Castro. New York and London: W.W. Norton & Company. ISBN 978-0393034851.
- González, Sergio-Albio (2010). El Gordo y Todos los Demás - Una Cuba que fue. Barcelona: Parnass. ISBN 978-8493740849.
