= 13 March Revolutionary Directorate =

Cuban activist group during the Cuban Revolution

Revolutionary Directorate of 13 March Movement
- Directorio Revolucionario 13 de Marzo
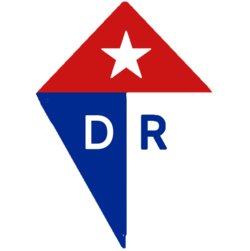
- Logo of the DR-13-M
- Other name: Revolutionary Directorate
- Leaders: José Antonio Echeverría; Faure Chomón; Rolando Cubela Secades
- Founded: 1954
- Dissolved: 1959
- Country: Cuba
- Active regions: Havana
- Ideology: Progressivism

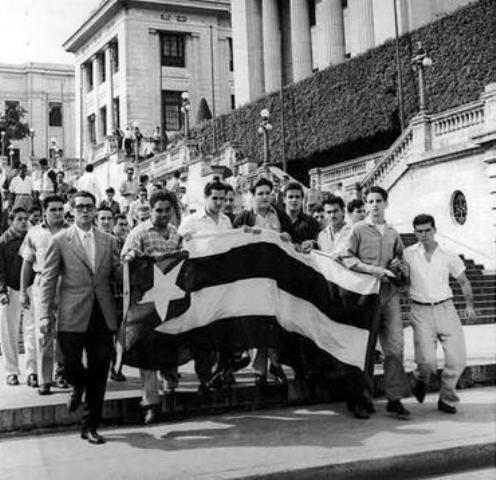
José Antonio Echeverría, Juan-Pedro Carbo, René Anillo, Luis Puig (2nd from right, last holding corner of flag) and others during a demonstration. University of Havana, Cuba.

The Revolutionary Directorate (DR), later the 13 March Revolutionary Directorate (DR-13-M) (Spanish: Directorio Revolucionario 13 de Marzo), was a Cuban activist group in the Cuban Revolution. They attempted an assassination on Batista, the dictator of Cuba at the time, in 1957.

== History ==
The DR was founded in 1954 as a Catholic student group opposed to the Cuban dictator Fulgencio Batista, defining its principles as political liberty, economic independence, and social justice. For a student group, the DR made military contributions to the Cuban Revolution by focusing on targeted plans.

In 1957, the group coordinated an attack on Batista's Presidential Palace organised by DR leader José Antonio Echeverría, who died the same day in a related incident, and the opening of a second front in the Escambray Mountains, which was taken over by Che Guevara.

The death of Echeverría and other leaders led to the virtual collapse of the group, and its remaining membership largely joined the Escambray front under the leadership of the 26th of July Movement. After the death of Echevarría, the leadership passed to Faure Chomón and Rolando Cubela Secades in the urban underground and the Escambray Mountain insurrection, respectively.

The DR-13-M's "Escambray Manifesto" of 24 February 1958 envisaged simultaneous urban and rural guerrilla warfare against Batista. It called for the restoration of the Constitution of 1940, and for social revolution, while attacking "those who only a few years ago supported the Nazis in the conquered lands of Europe". As the manifesto circulated throughout the island, the Escambray guerrillas gained strength.

== Gallery ==
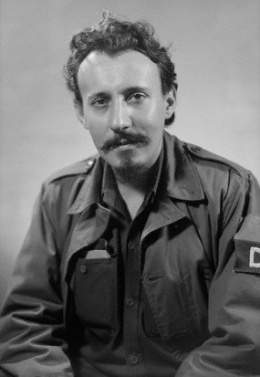
Faure Chomón.

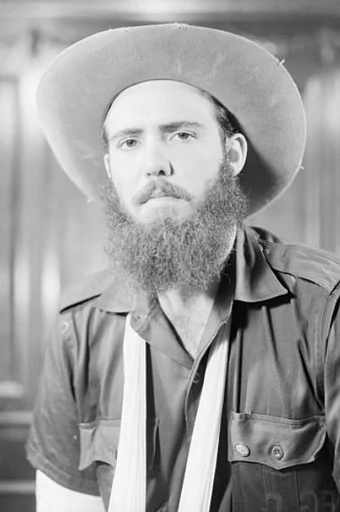
Rolando Cubela Secades.

Another flag used by the DR-13-M

== Bibliography ==
- Bonachea, Ramón L.; San Martin, Marta (2017) [First published 1974]. The Cuban Insurrection, 1952–1959. London and New York: Routledge. ISBN 978-0-87855-576-5. ISBN 978-1-138-53497-1.
