= Radiocentro CMQ Building =

Multi-use complex in El Vedado, Cuba

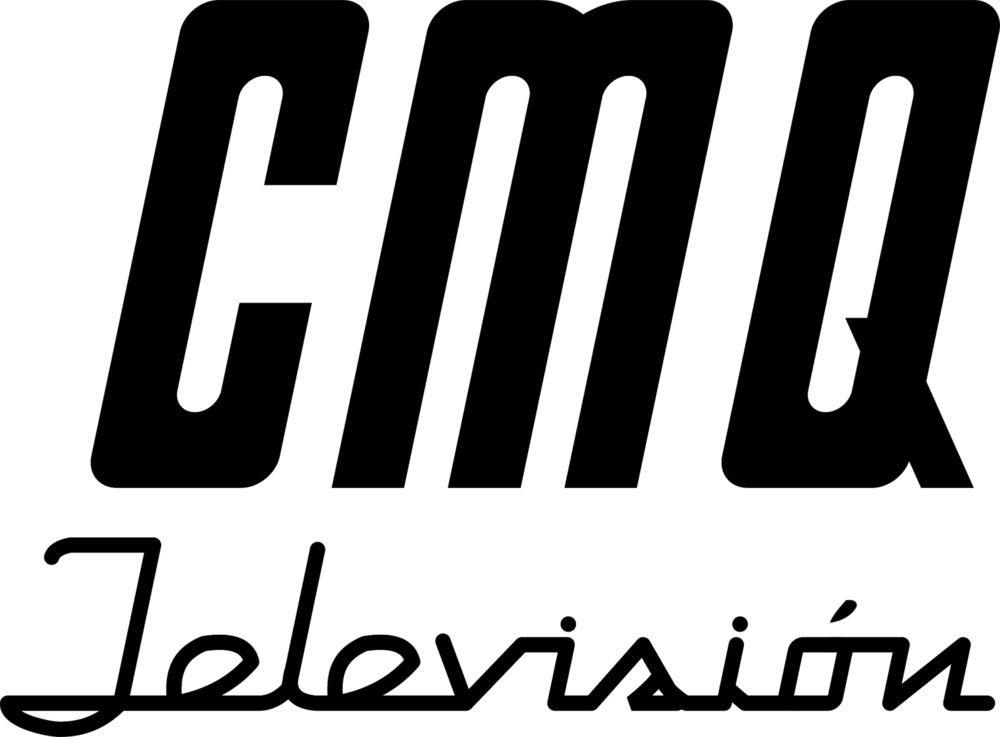
- CMQ logo,1950

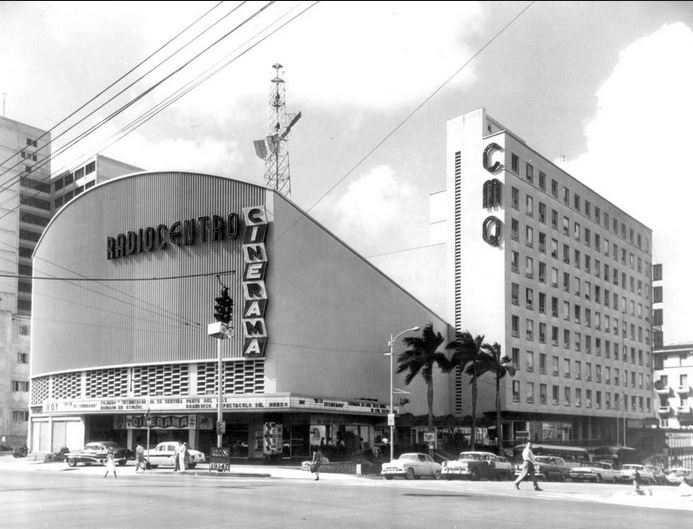
- Alternative names: CMQ

General information
- Type: Radio & television studios, commercial, offices, movie theatre
- Architectural style: Modern
- Location: El Vedado, 363 Calle L, (btwn L y M) El Vedado, Havana, Ciudad de La Habana, Cuba
- Coordinates: 23°8′24″N 82°23′0″W
- Estimated completion: 1947
- Owner: Goar and Abel Mestre

Height
- Roof: 35 metres (115 ft)

Technical details
- Structural system: Steel frame
- Material: Concrete
- Floor count: 10
- Floor area: 21,802 m^{2} (234,670 sq ft)
- Lifts/elevators: 3
- Grounds: 6,254 m^{2} (67,320 sq ft)

Design and construction
- Architects: Martín Domínguez Esteban, Miguel Gastón and Emilio del Junco
- Structural engineer: Purdy and Henderson, Engineers
- Designations: CMQ
- Known for: First mixed use building in Havana

The Radiocentro CMQ Building complex is a former radio and television production facility and office building at the intersection of Calle L and La Rampa in El Vedado, Cuba. It was modeled after Raymond Hood's 1933 Rockefeller Center in New York City. With 1,650 seats, the theater first opened on December 23, 1947, under the name Teatro Warner Radiocentro, it was owned by brothers Goar and Abel Mestre. Today the building serves as the headquarters of the Cuban Institute of Radio and Television (ICRT).

== Construction ==
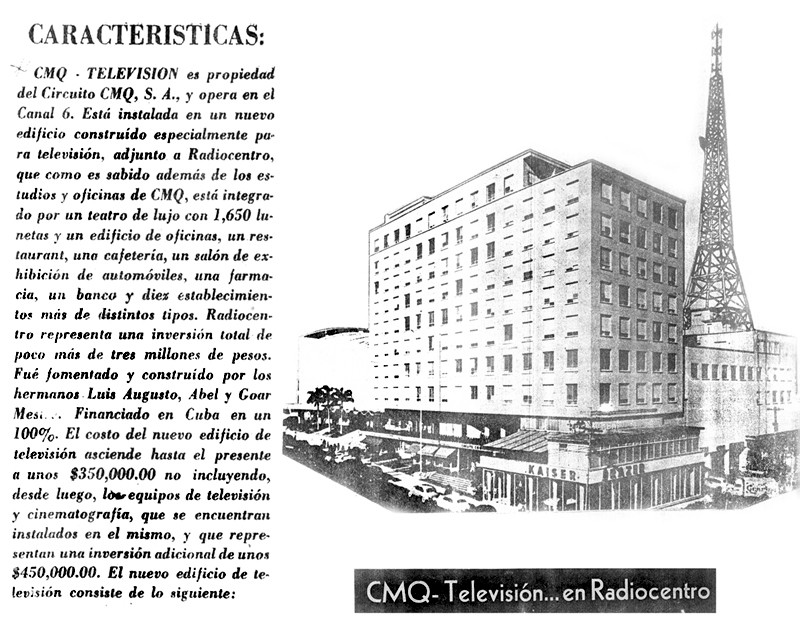
Building characteristics advertisement. ca 1948

For the construction of this building, the Havana building authorities granted a permit in 1947 amending the ordinances that were then in effect in El Vedado prohibiting the construction of buildings of more than three storeys. This statute was modified six years later to expand the construction of up to four floors because many planners and owners claimed the need to authorize them to build taller buildings in the area.

The building was set back from the property line five meters, adding four meters for an arcade which allowed a distance from the road while adjusting to the strong slope of 23rd Street, in this way the arcade became a wide gallery and at the same time sub-divided the basement level.

This gallery became the covered hall of the cinema located in the upper corner with Calle L. The building had an expressionist curved cover of a large scale relating to the important intersection. This same scale was adopted in the restaurant that was located on the opposite corner on M. Street. The wide gallery gives access to the lobby of the office building. The third building is set up by a prismatic piece on M Street, also set back to emphasize the two corners.

== Program ==
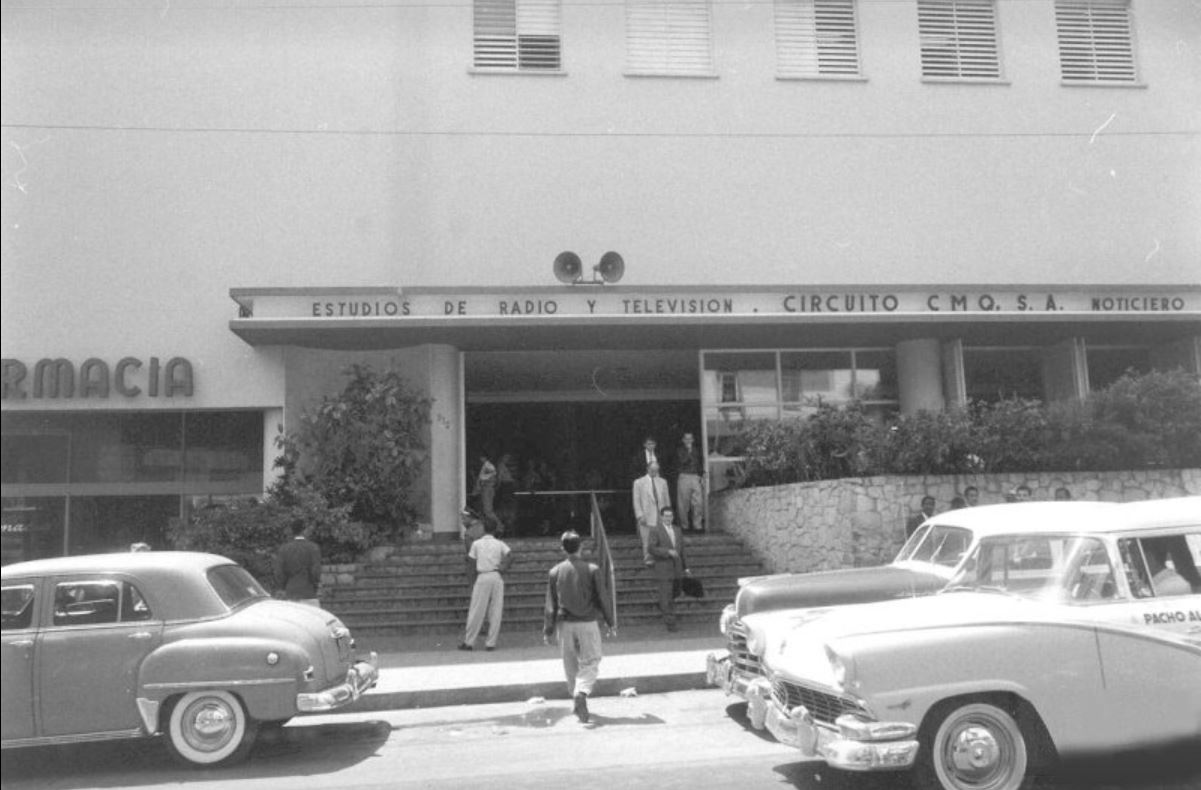
Edificio Radiocentro CMQ. Television studios entrance on Calle M.

The cinema with a capacity for 1,700 spectators was originally a Cinerama which used three projectors and a twenty-five-foot radius screen. It had a small stage in which short-term shows could be offered, in order to entertain the audience in the middle of the films.

The radio station CMQ occupied part of the offices of the ten-story building, which was attached to the block of rental offices. In this area, a part of the land had also been reserved for future television installations, which had not yet been built. In one of its studios, Studio Number 2 was the venue not only of radio program transmissions but also that studio was the location of all or most of the RCA Victor recordings in Cuba from 1948 to 1959. The label at the CMQ complex was Discuba, a Cuban record label founded in 1959 by RCA Victor. It released music by several internationally successful artists such as Celia Cruz, Beny Moré, Orquesta Aragón and La Lupe.

The ground floor, which was common for the entire complex, had different types of commercial establishments: several exhibition halls, a bank, a restaurant, and a cafeteria. The pedestrian circulation was designed in such a way so that it made it necessary to pass in front of these premises.

== CMQ Radio ==
La Tremenda Corte aired uninterrupted from 1942 to 1961 (first RHC Cadena Azul and later at QMC), and its sole writer was Vispo. Despite such strenuous work for his imagination, Vispo always managed to pull through during this period. Over 360 shows are estimated to have been recorded, many of which are still heard on radio, but a few such episodes have never left Cuba and little is therefore known about them. Of all these missing radio shows were recorded at station CMQ in Havana, between 1947 and 1961, no one knows how many still survive, and they are considered rare and invaluable for fans and collectors of the series. In the peak of their success, the performances of the cast were taken to countries such as Puerto Rico, Venezuela, Colombia, Peru, Panama and the Dominican Republic, where they were acclaimed.

== Architecture ==
Radiocentro CMQ Building floor plan showing Cinerama theater, domino frame structure office building and radio and television studios.

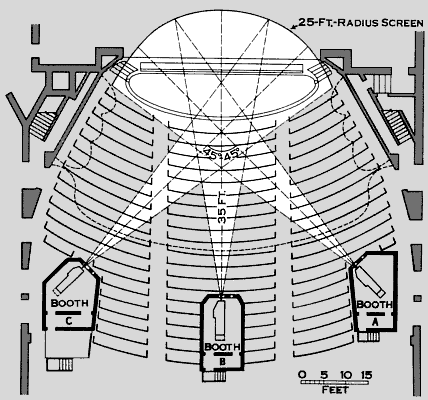
Cinerama using three projectors and curved screen.

The Radiocentro CMQ Building of 1947, built on 23rd Street between Calles L and M in El Vedado, was the first mixed use building in Cuba. The architectural program of the building included businesses, offices, radio, and television studios, as well as the Cinerama Warner cinema. This project joined the expertise of the structural engineers, the U.S. firm Purdy and Henderson, Engineers, and the architects Martín Domínguez Esteban and Miguel Gastón and Emilio del Junco, all members of the ATEC (Cuban section of the CIAM). The building had a great impact since it was published in the magazine L'Architecture d'aujourd'hui. The building is a series of independent boxes, it was designed by the Basque architect Martín Domínguez Esteban (1897–1970). Esteban had been the architect of the Hipódromo de la Zarzuela, along with Carlos Arniches.

The CMQ Building was loosely modeled after Raymond Hood's Rockefeller Center. The Radiocentro CMQ Building had an impact on many Cuban architects who subscribed to Modern architecture and buildings that would be built in the following years, such as the Hotel Habana Hilton across La Rampa (now known as Hotel Habana Libre) designed by Welton Becket and associates with the Cuban architectural firm of Arroyo and Menéndez, the1958, the twenty-three story Edificio Seguro Medico by Antonio Quintana, among others.

Walter Gropius, during a visit he made in 1949 to Havana referred to the Radiocentro CMQ Building to defend the need for architectural teamwork and collaboration among architects: It is impossible for the architect to know all of the equipment and installation requirements; therefor, it is necessary for the cooperation of architectural specialists.

== FOCSA Building ==
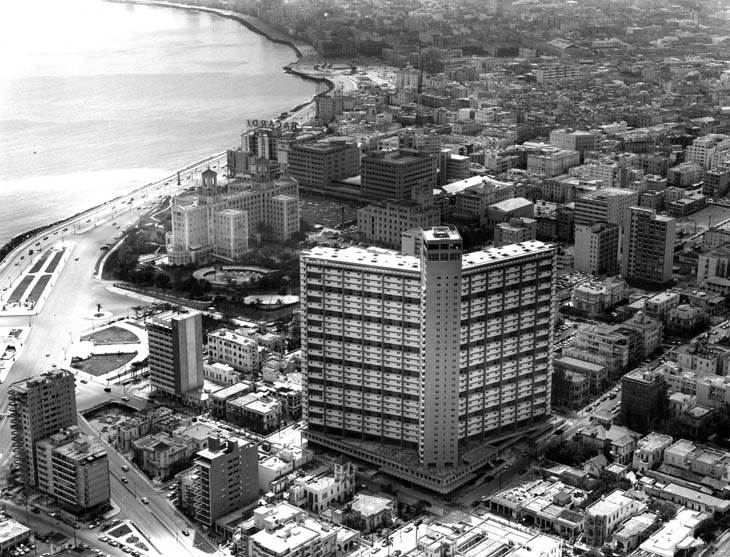
The FOCSA Building

In 1952 the CMQ Radio and TV Network planned to provide administrative offices, a radio station and housing for employees. CMQ selected a 10,000 m^{2} (110,000 sq ft) plot of land costing approximately 700,000 pesos. The company Fomento de Hipotecas Aseguradas (FHA) financed 80% of the cost of the residences and 60% of the commercial shops. El Banco Continental Cubano granted a credit of 6 million pesos.

Martín Domínguez Esteban with Ernesto Gómez-Sampera designed the FOCSA Building, a modernist project aimed to provide housing for its workers and additional radio stations. Work began in February 1954 and finished in June 1956. At the time of construction it was the second-largest residential concrete building in the world, second only to the Martinelli Building in São Paulo, Brazil. It surpassed the López Serrano Building in height which had been Cuba's tallest building.

The FOCSA shares some curious design similarities with the Edificio del Seguro Médico of 1958 by Antonio Quintana including single loading of apartments, natural ventilation of the apartments and a small rear window under the kitchen cabinets marking vertically the center of the wall.

== El Salon de Mayo ==
In 1943 while France was under German occupation, a group of Paris artists in a café on the Rue Dauphineartists formed what they called an association with the intent to exhibit art as an answer to the Nazi party's description of Modern art as Degenerate art; eventually, they organized the Salon de Mai. The group presented its first exhibition in May 1945. Under the leadership of Gaston Diehl, the first Salon de Mai exhibition took place in the Galerie Pierre Maurs (3, avenue Matignon) from 29 May to 29 June 1945. More than 20 years later in July 1967, the Salon de Mayo came to Havana as el Salón de Mayo. It was the group's first exhibition in America.

The Salón de Mayo was an art exhibition in Havana that took place in July 1967. It was an artists' collective that took its name from the Parisian Salon de Mai and was organized by Carlos Franqui with the assistance from Wifredo Lam, René Portocarrero, Alexander Calder, Joan Miró and Pablo Picasso. The exhibition presented works by more than one hundred artists and represented rival schools of twentieth-century art as well as early modernists (Picasso, Miro, Magritte).

Fifteen artists contributed their original works to be reproduced in sidewalk mosaics of integral color granite by the Cuban company Ornacen, with the help of the architects Fernando Salinas and Eduardo Rodríguez acting as technical consultants. The image of the mosaics was obtained with a cement mixture colored with fine gravel of crushed marble and marble powder, then polished. Bronze sheets delimited the embedded mosaics. The mosaics are approximately fourteen to eighteen inches square and 15 different designs are repeated over several blocks. There are 180 mosaics in total.

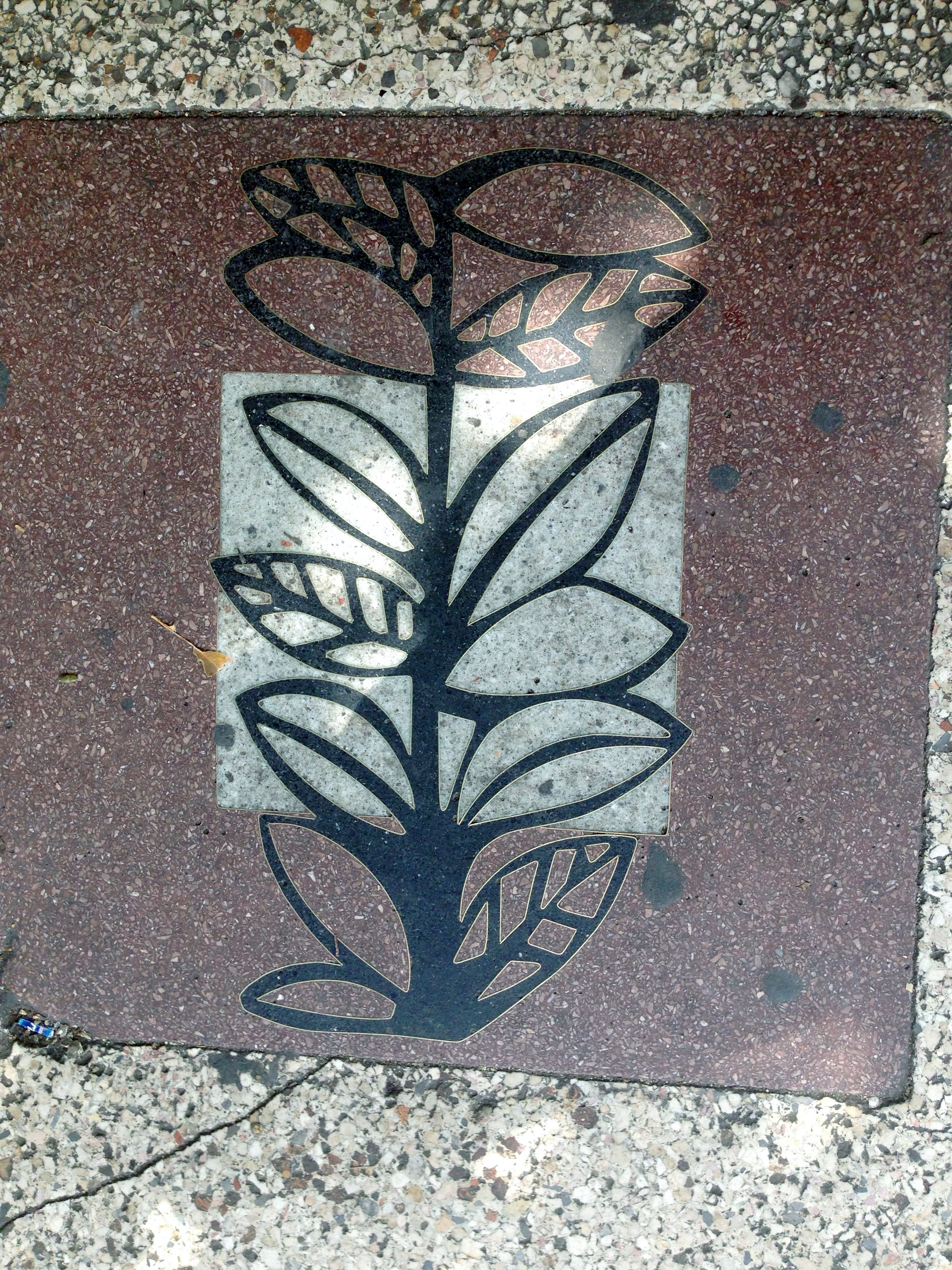
Salón de Mayo, 1967. Rene Portocarrero.

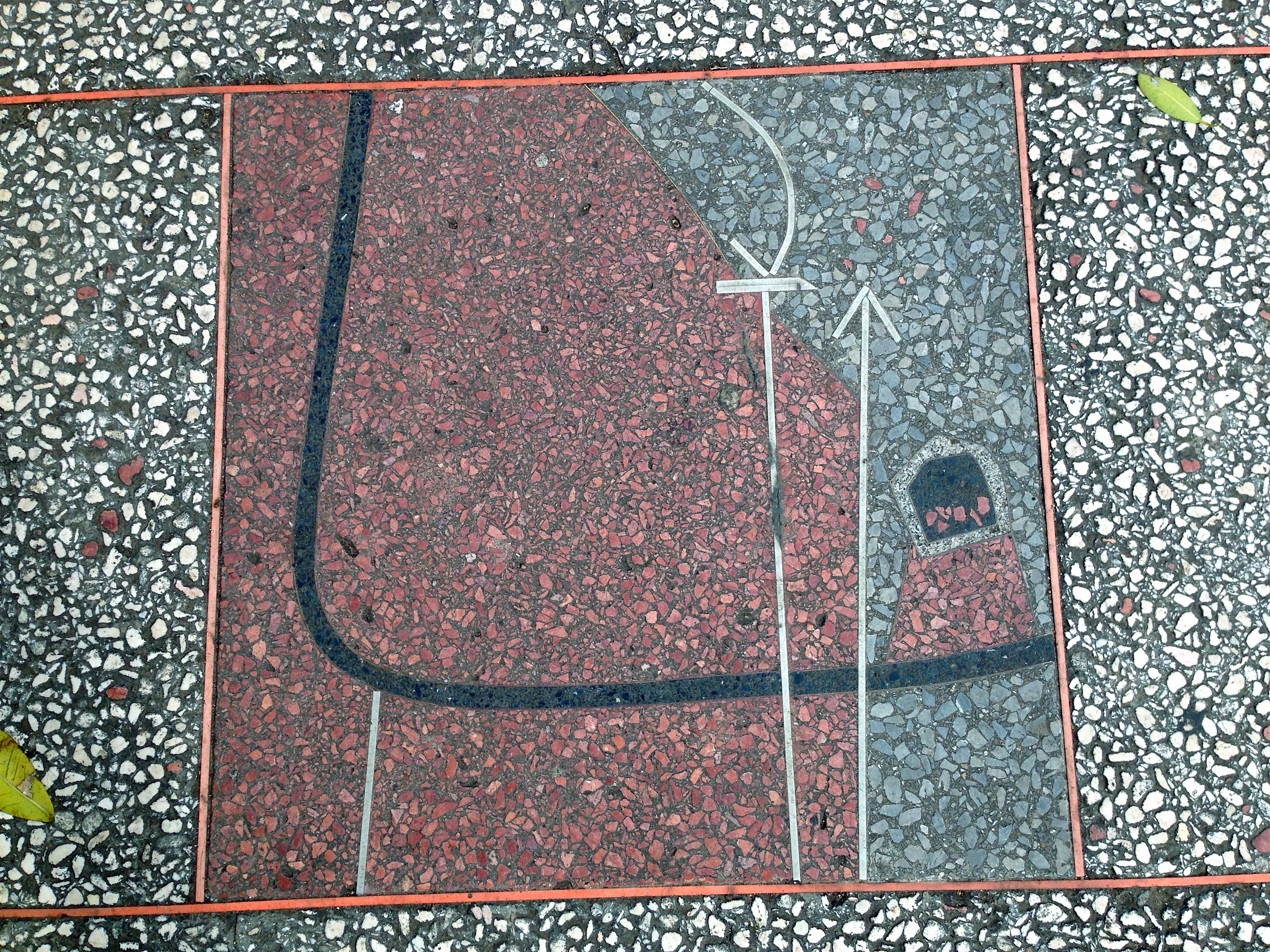
Salón de Mayo, 1967.

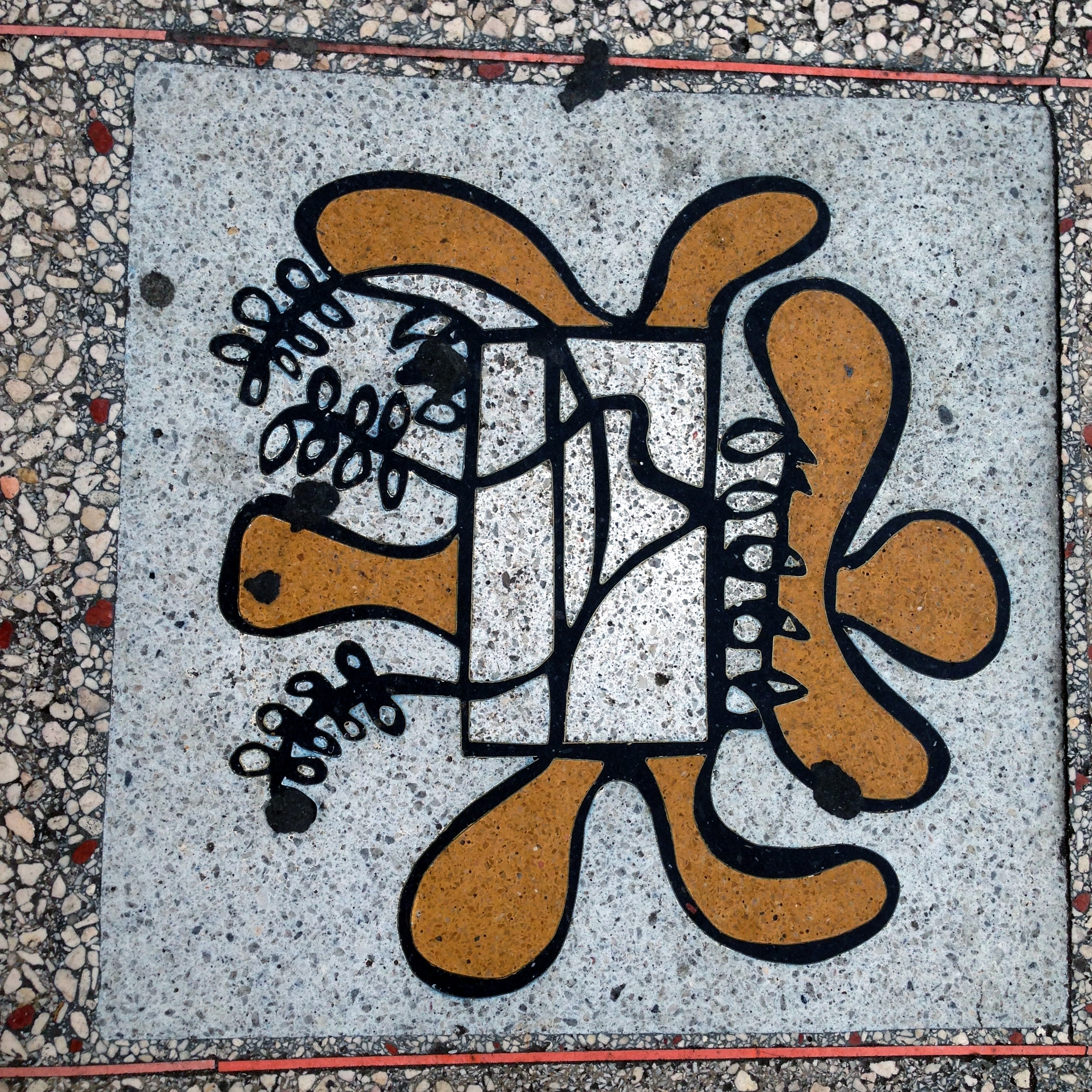
Salón de Mayo, 1967. Amelia Peláez.

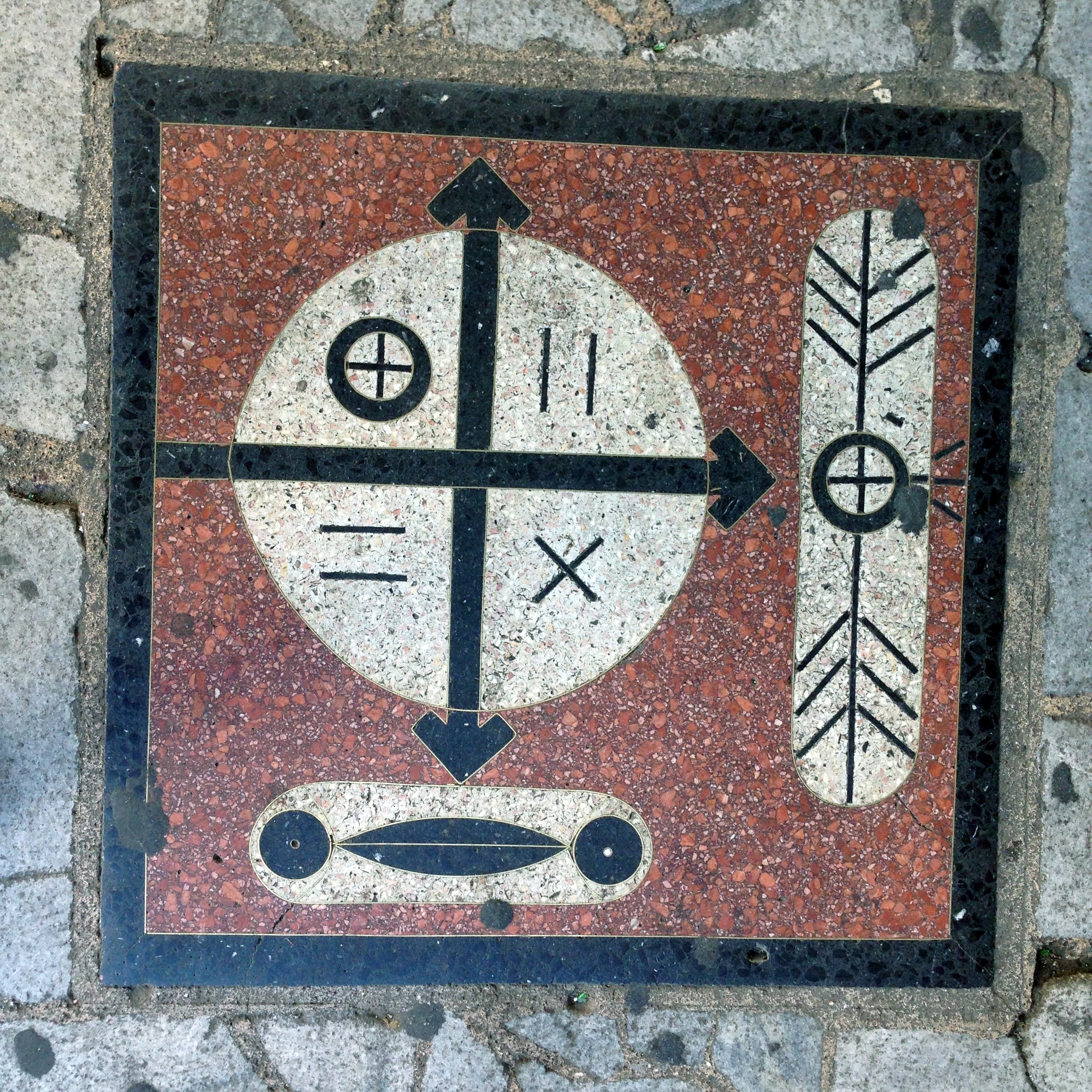
Salón de Mayo, 1967. Antonia Eiriz.

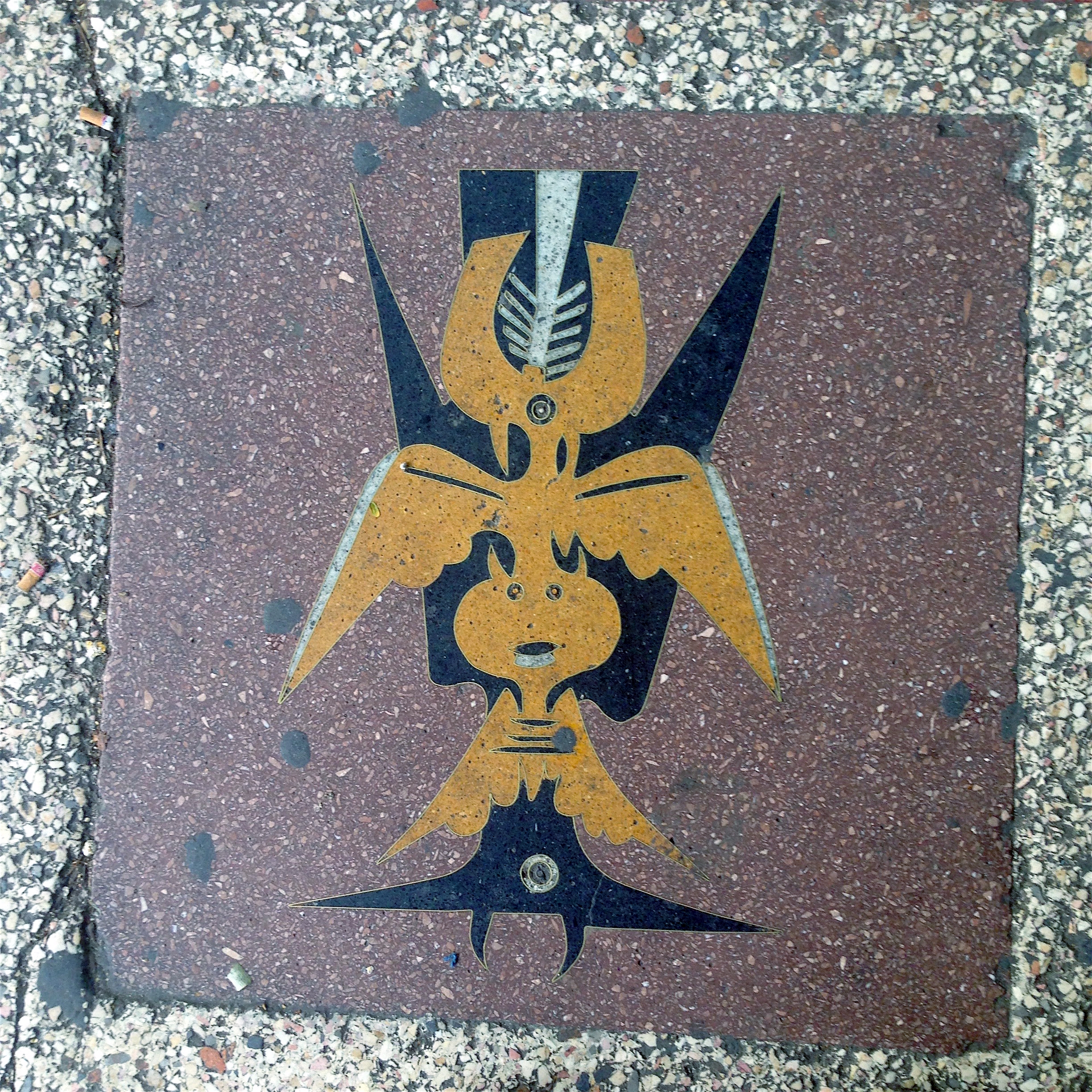
Salón de Mayo, 1967. Wifredo Lam.

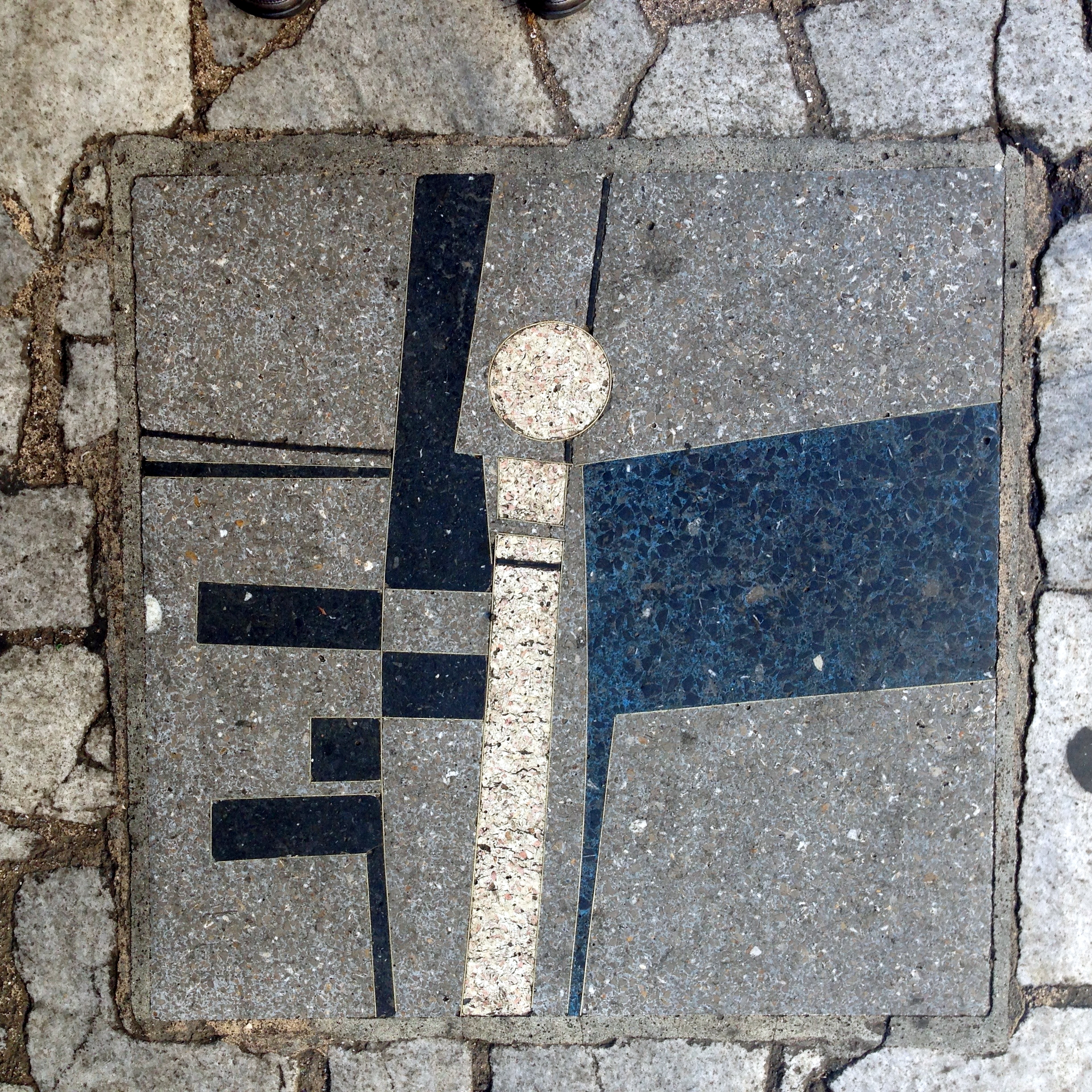
Salón de Mayo, 1967.

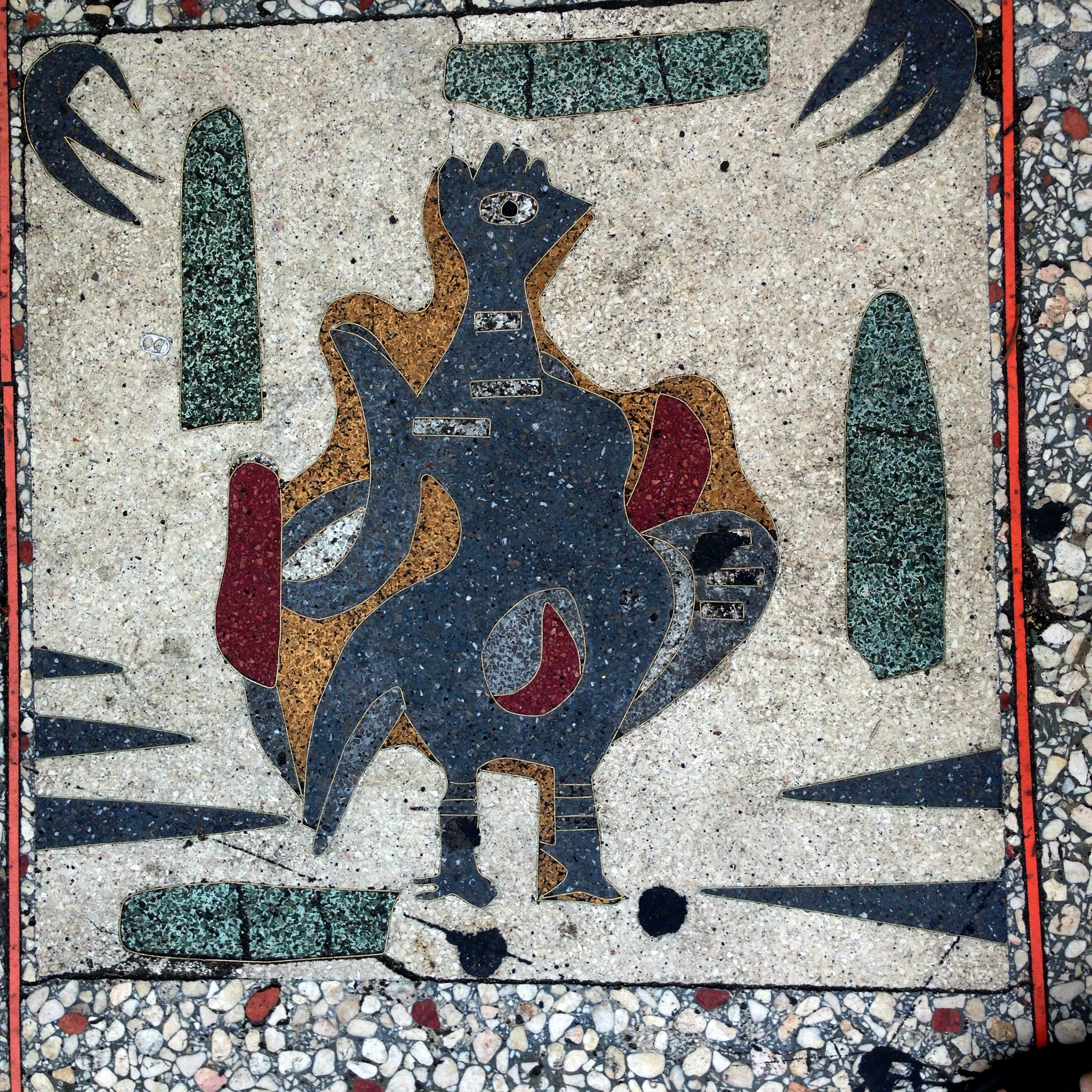
Salón de Mayo, 1967. Mariano Rodriguez

The sidewalks along Calle L and Calle 23 in front of the Radiocentro CMQ Building (now Yara Cinema) one can still find the works of the artists who contributed designs such as Wifredo Lam, René Portocarrero, Hugo Consuegra, Mariano Rodríguez, Cundo Bermúdez, Cundo Bermúdez, Amelia Peláez, Luis Martínez Pedro, Salvador Corratge, Raúl Martínez, Antonio Vidal, Mariano Rodríguez and Sandu Darié.

== Presidential palace attack ==
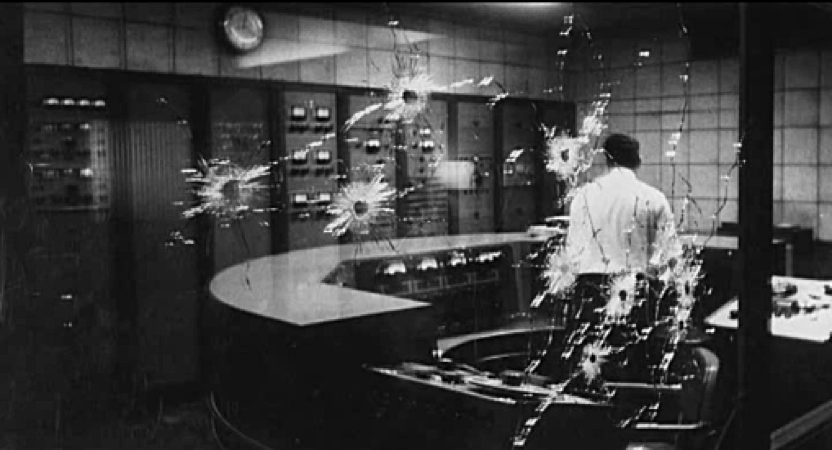
Attack on Radio Reloj. CMQ Radio station, March 13, 1957.

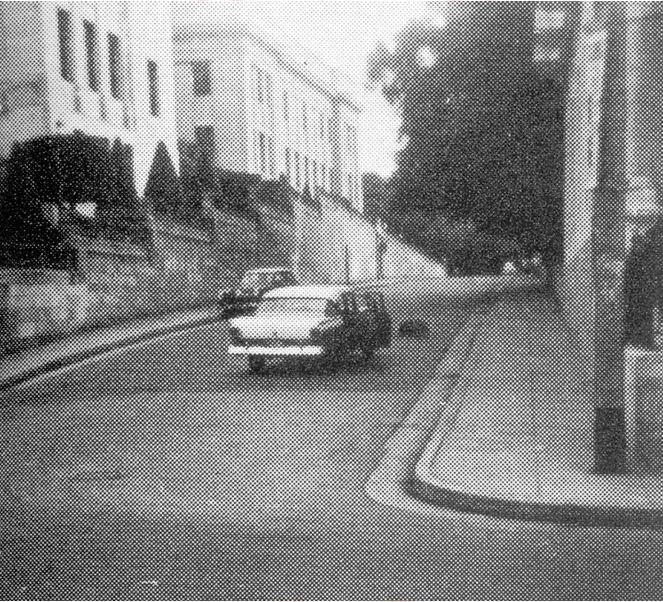
Echeverría's car at L and Jovellar where he was killed. He was on the way back to the Architecture School located at the rear of the university.

The Radiocentro CMQ Building played a part in the general plan of the Presidential Palace Attack of 1957 where over fifty people died, as explained by Faure Chaumón Mediavilla, one of the leaders of the attack. The plan had been to attack and kill Fulgencio Batista at his office in the Presidential Palace by a commando of about fifty men and simultaneously support this operation with more than one hundred men, some would occupy the radio station Radio Reloj at the CMQ complex to announce the news of Batista's death and to encourage the people of Havana into a general strike and to incite them to join an armed rebellion. José Antonio Echeverría, who was President of the Federation of University Students (Federación Estudiantil Universitaria - FEU), and leader of the assault of CMQ Radio made the speech at the regular time of a music program which most people listened to so that Echeverría's anti-Batista speech would be broadcast to the whole Cuban nation. Echeverría estimated that the rioters could only occupy the radio station for three minutes, therefore he had to prepare a speech which lasted three minutes at most. Echeverría managed to finish his speech at the 181st-second mark. He managed to leave the station unharmed and on the way to the University of Havana, just a few blocks away, his car was intercepted by a patrol car. He was killed during the shootout on the sidewalk of the north side of the university.

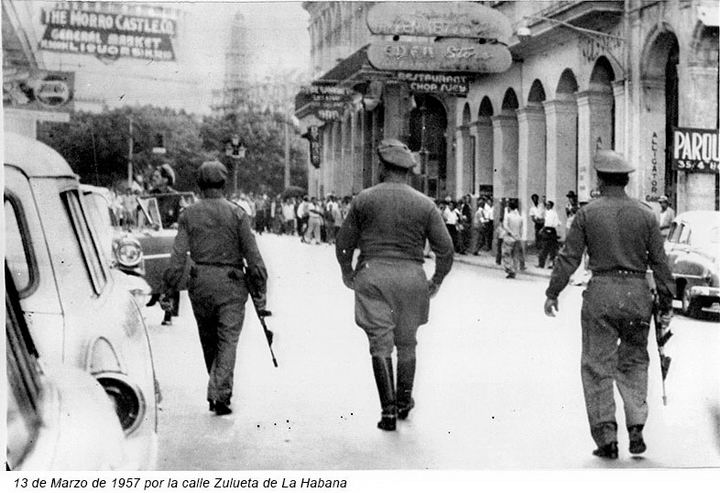
Havana Police with machine guns immediately following the attack on Calle Zulueta, March 13, 1957

Otto Hernández Fernández the last survivor of the Radio Reloj, CMQ attack remembers March 13, 1957:

"The assailants went out in three cars to Radio Reloj. Carlos Figueredo traveled as our driver, Fructuoso Rodríguez, José Antonio Echeverría, Joe Westbrook and myself. According to our plan, Echeverría was the only one that had to reach the door of the CMQ station building. The other two had the mission of closing the street in each corner to avoid interruptions. They entered the building with authority. While they went up to the transmission booth, the driver concentrated on preventing the car from going out, and I went out with the machine gun to ensure the return without mishap. About five minutes later I see that the doorman starts to close a large glass door. While Figueredo shoots twice from his seat, I go to the entrance of CMQ, I point (my gun) at the guard and I say "do not close, because if you do I'll open it up with bullets." That man was paralyzed, but he did not continue. Just a moment later Jose Antonio and the others come down. They had cut the transmission and did not finish reading the message. When we passed the corner of Jovellar and L we felt the siren of a police car after us. Right there I told the Chinese Figueredo to keep quiet and let the patrol pass. Well, he started like a fireball and rammed the police car almost head-on. With the crash, I fell to the ground, but I remember how Jose Antonio had the impulse to open the door shooting at the cops. Even today I have very clear in my memory the fat man falling almost in front of us."

== Gallery ==
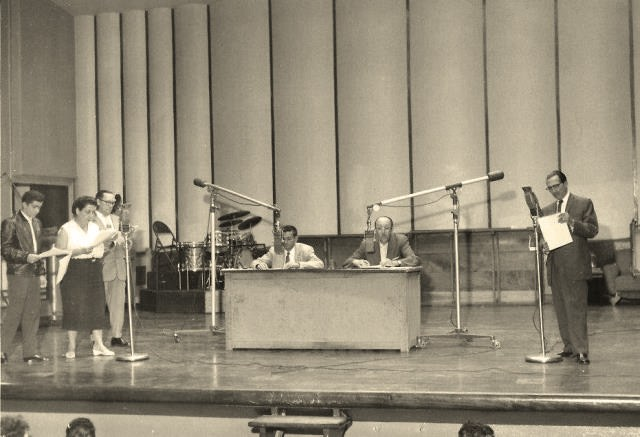
Live radio transmission of La Tremenda Corte in one of Radio CMQ Studios

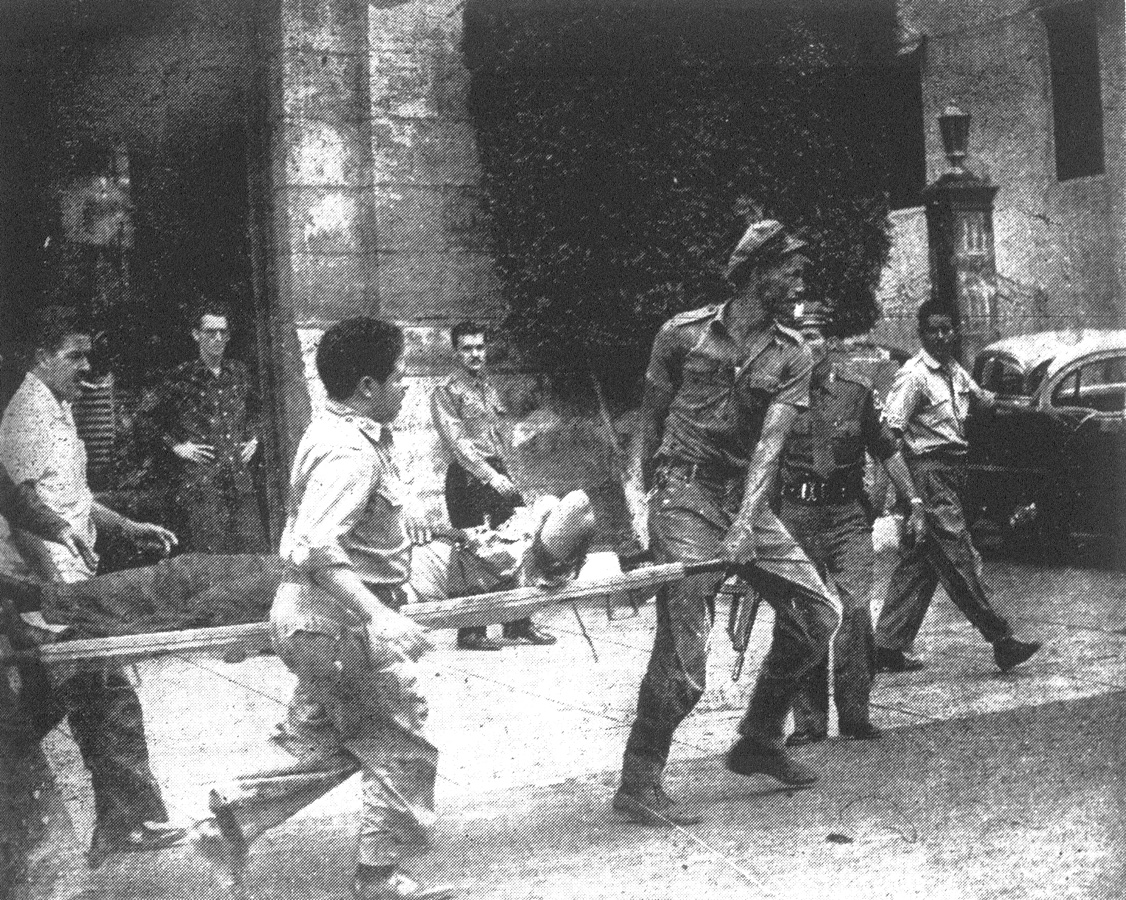
Presidential Palace Attack, Havana, Cuba. 1957

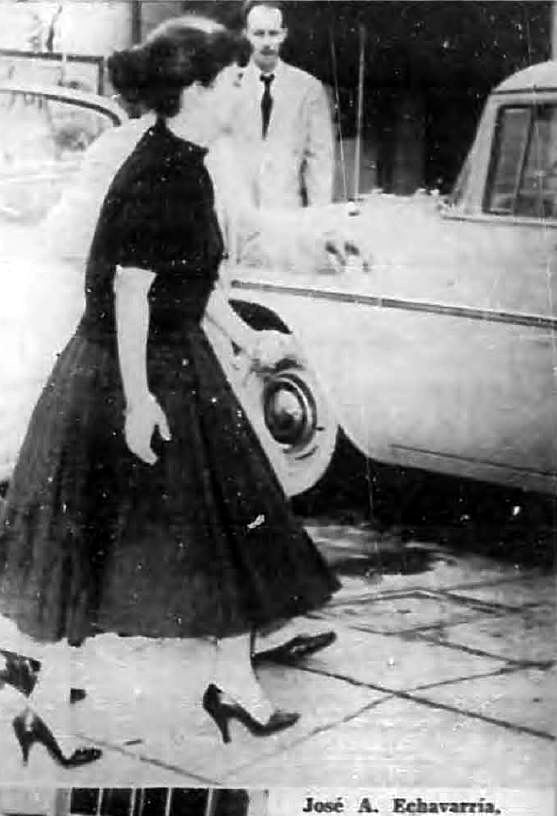
Antonio Echevarria's girlfriend days after the attack. Havana, 1957.

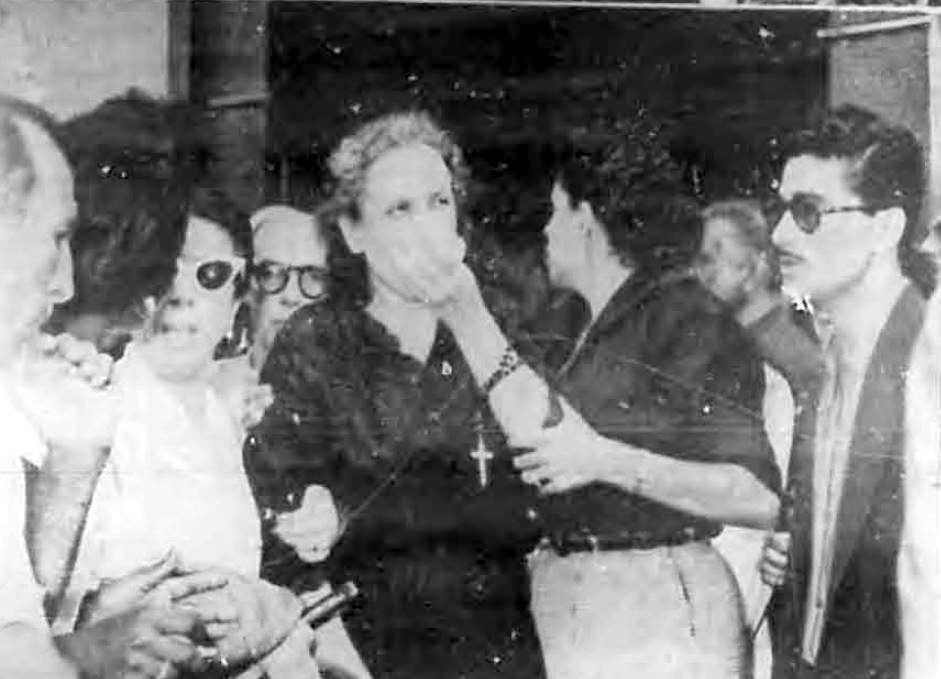
Antonio Echevarria's mother. Havana, 1957.

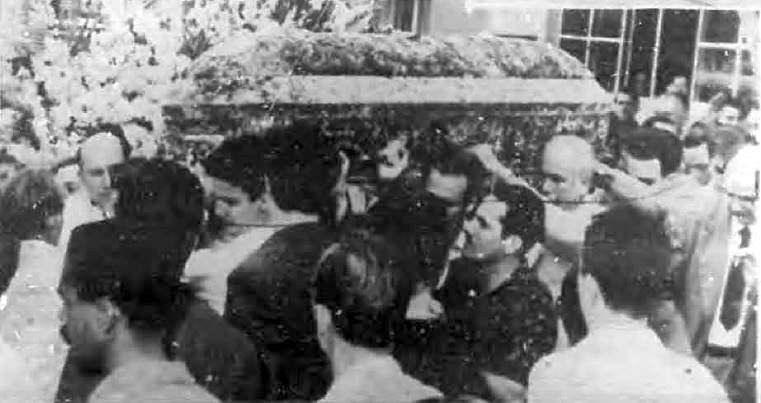
Antonio Echevarria funeral. Havana, 1957.

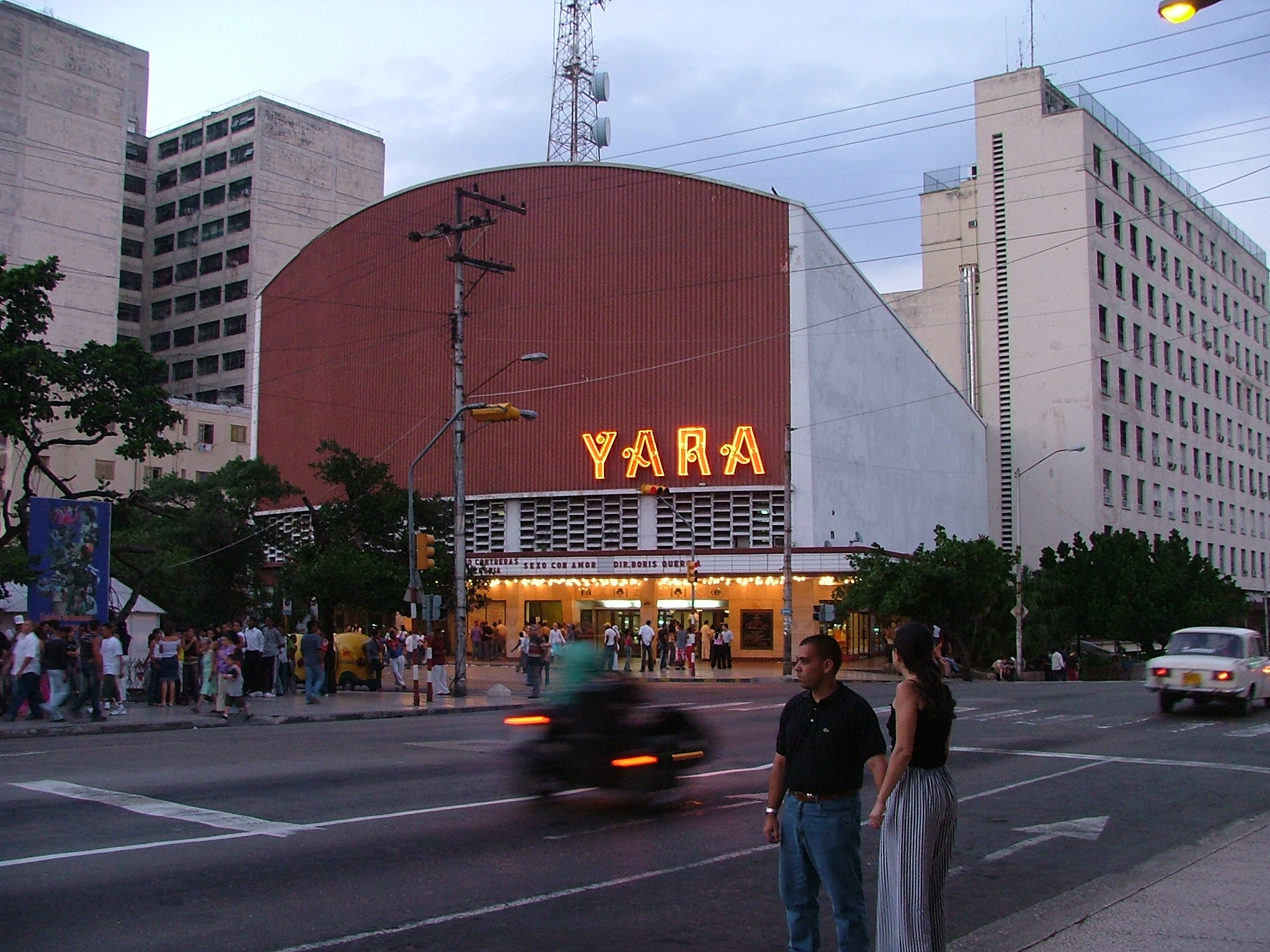
Radiocentro CMQ Building in 2004

== See also ==
- FOCSA Building
- Edificio del Seguro Médico, Havana
- López Serrano Building
- Havana Presidential Palace attack (1957)
- Humboldt 7 massacre
- Directorio Revolucionario Estudiantil

== Bibliography ==
- DÍEZ-PASTOR IRIBAS, C. (2003): Carlos Arniches y Martín Domínguez, arquitectos de la generación del 25, Librería MAIREA, Madrid.
- GÓMEZ DÍAZ, F. (2008): "Martín Domínguez Esteban. La labor de un arquitecto español exiliado en Cuba", RA Revista de Arquitectura, Universidad de Navarra, Navarra, Vol. 10: 59–68.
- MUÑOZ HERNÁNDEZ, R. (2011): "Edificios altos del Movimiento Moderno". Arquitectura y Urbanismo, Vol. XXXII, No. 1/2011.
