= Salón de Mayo =

1967 art exhibition in Havana, Cuba

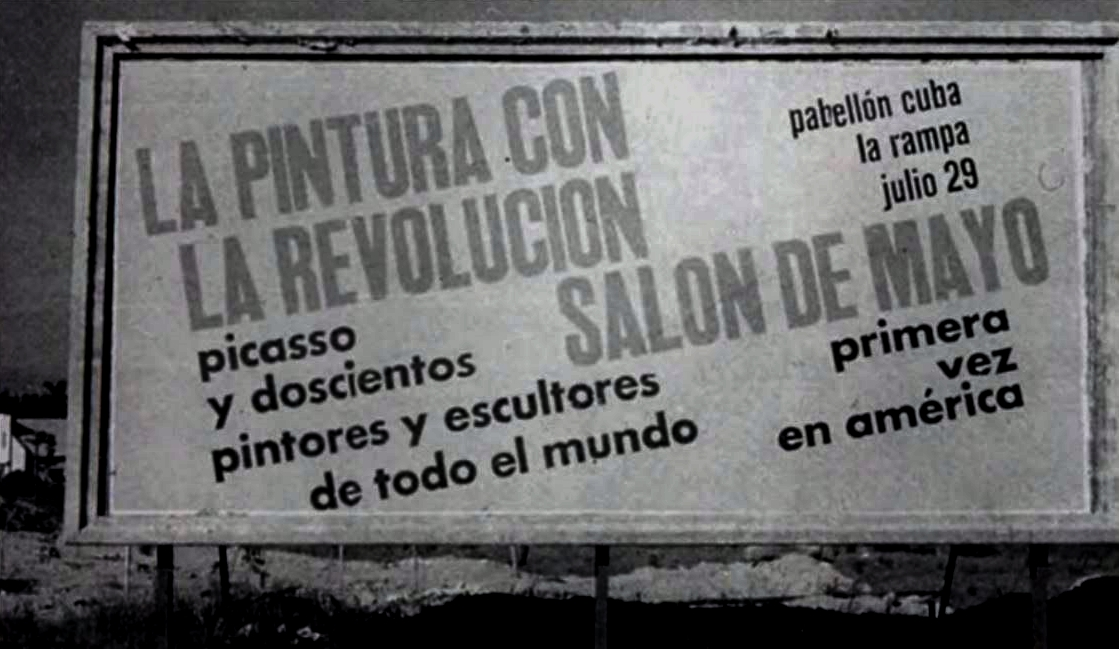
Salón de Mayo Billboard.

The Salón de Mayo (May Salon) was an art exhibition held in Havana, Cuba, in July 1967. It took its name from the Salon de Mai, an artists collective founded during the Nazi occupation of France. It was organized by Carlos Franqui with the assistance of such artists as Wifredo Lam, René Portocarrero, Alexander Calder, Joan Miró, Pablo Picasso.

The exhibition presented works by more than a hundred artists and represented rival schools of twentieth-century art: early modernists (Picasso, Miró, Magritte); the next generation (Lam, Calder, Jacques Hérold, Stanley Hayter); and postwar (Asger Jorn, Antonio Saura, Jorge Soto).

Lam wrote to Franqui in anticipation of the event and his hopes:

...that young painters and sculptors would be able to work in a socialist country such as Cuba and enjoy the spontaneity of creating something so that they would have memories of the pleasure they experienced working in Cuba just for the sake of working.

Some artists were invited to create works in Cuba in the weeks preceding the exhibition, with those works donated to the Cuban government to form the nucleus of the collection of a contemporary art museum. The museum was never constructed.

Collaborative engagement was a principal theme of the event. On 19 July 1967, more than eighty artists and writers contributed to a mural, Cuba colectiva, in front of the Cuba Pavilion in Havana, adding either images or text inside spiral bands that circled outward from a central image of "rhomboid heads" by Lam. A Paris newspaper described the event:

...with a speed that is typically Cuban, a giant white canvas was hung in the outdoors, practically in the street, in the humid night air of the tropics ... It had the feel of a somewhat surrealist magic ceremony which was celebrated in the midst of a popular festival. Although not a drop of alcohol was consumed, the event was intoxicating

In Franqui's words the enterprise represented:

a collective art, a socialist art, an art of liberty, of revolution, imaginative, convulsive, revolutionary, popular ... For the first time, during the night, revolutionary artists and the people created an imaginative reality.

The Surrealists had dreamed of "a revolutionary imagination that could support social change" and this event, in the estimation of one art historian, "delivered the opportunity for Surrealist adherents to participate satisfactorily–if only briefly–in an act of solidarity with an actual revolutionary regime ... that accommodated both sensuality and revolutionary rectitude." The radical poet Alain Jouffroy wrote:

The Collective Mural of Cuba represents a new cultural and historical reality through which the individual unconscious is for the first time in direct dialogue with the collective political conscious. The ideology of Che [Guevara] was present, as well as a sensuality, a festiveness, a delirium, a tenderness, friendship ... and it is enough that the Cuban revolution set the context in which revolutionary artists and intellectuals met, where hope for a reconciliation of the subversive imagination and revolutionary political reason become a reality. The riskiest venture for man today, which would allow him to communicate most directly with pleasure and death, is to participate in and dedicate himself to revolution.

The Salón was a unique event under a regime that, in the words of a writer who was later imprisoned, "used every imaginable pretext to keep culture on a short leash". As a demonstration of vigorous self-expression, the Salón de Mayo has also been interpreted as a rejection of the Soviet Union's approach to artistic endeavor, an assertion on the part of Communist Cuba of its independence from the Soviet model. Within Cuba, the Salón de Mayo represented the high point of free artistic expression. Some in Cuba's cultural establishment resented the influence of foreigners and visiting intellectuals, and they took measures soon after against writers identified as dissidents.

The Cuban government released a series of commemorative stamps that depicted 25 of the works included in the show.
