= Bank of Nova Scotia Building, Havana =

Building in Havana, Cuba

Bank of Nova Scotia Building
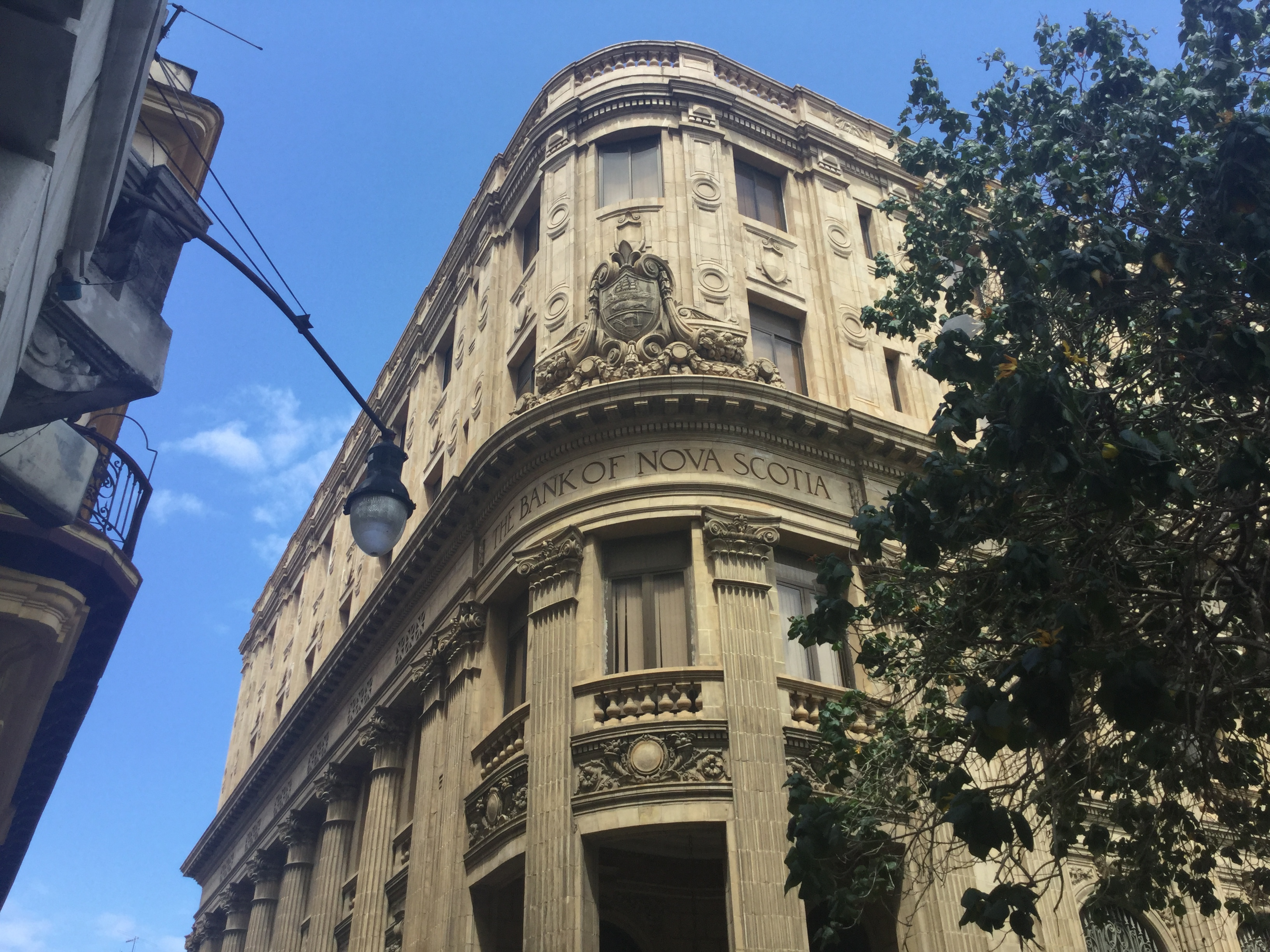
- Interactive map of the Bank of Nova Scotia Building area

General information
- Status: Occupied
- Type: Bank-office
- Architectural style: Neoclassical
- Location: Habana Vieja, Calles O´Really y Cuba, Ciudad de La Habana, Cuba
- Coordinates: 23°08′22.82″N 82°21′8.28″W
- Estimated completion: 1906
- Renovated: 2014

Technical details
- Structural system: Steel frame
- Floor count: 4

Website
- www.scotiabank.com/global/en/country/cuba.html

Bank of Nova Scotia Building, Havana is a Neoclassical-style bank building located at the intersection of Calle O´Reilly and Calle Cuba in old Havana.

Built in 1906, the building was branch and business offices for Canadian-based Bank of Nova Scotia in the early 20th century. Additional floors were added in 1914 to the original two-floor building. It also served as a Scotiabank's branch in Havana and sold to a local bank Banco Metropolitano S.A. (founded 1996).

Once one of the most important foreign banks in Cuba, Scotiabank is one of the few foreign banks allowed to retain offices in the country after 1959. Today Scotiabank focusses on business banking (after approval in 2011) and no longer operates banking branches (ceased in 1959 when all non-Cuban banks closed operations and transferred to Banco Nacional de Cuba) in Cuba.

Rival Royal Bank of Canada operated in Cuba from 1899 with 24 branches (from high of 65 in the 1920s) when it was forced to sell their operations in 1960. A former branch building in Havana and is being renovated since 2012 after sitting vacant

== See also ==
- List of banks in Cuba
- National Bank of Canada - operating in Cuba since the mid 1990s
- Royal Bank of Canada Building, Havana
