= Royal Bank of Canada Building, Havana =

Royal Bank of Canada Building
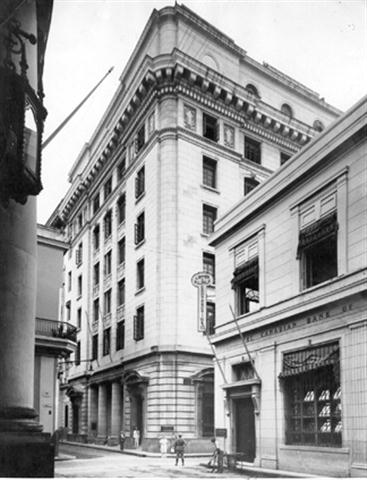
- Interactive map of the Royal Bank of Canada Building area
- Former names: Royal Bank of Canada

General information
- Type: Commercial
- Architectural style: Neoclassical
- Location: Habana Vieja, Calle Aguiar 367, Ciudad de La Habana, Cuba
- Coordinates: 23°08′17.4″N 82°21′09.3″W
- Current tenants: Tribunal Supremo Popular
- Construction started: 1917
- Opened: 1919
- Closed: 1960
- Owner: Bank of Canada

Technical details
- Structural system: Steel frame
- Floor count: 7
- Lifts/elevators: 2

Design and construction
- Architect: Godfrey Davenport
- Architecture firm: Purdy and Henderson

Website
- www.tsp.gob.cu/es

Royal Bank of Canada Building, Havana is a Neoclassical-style bank building located at corner of Calles Aguiar and Obrapia in Habana Vieja. The ground floor was dedicated to the bank, the other floors to offices that were rented; a floor was added (seventh floor) for a semiprivate restaurant and club.

Built in 1917, the building was designed by New York-based firm Purdy and Henderson, Engineers, but supervised by Sumner Godfrey Davenport, who would subsequently join the bank in Havana in 1920. In the same year Davenport moved to Canada to become the bank's chief architect.

This building would be one of Royal Bank of Canada's 65 branches that existed in the 1920s and 24 by the time it was forced to close in 1960.

== Gallery ==
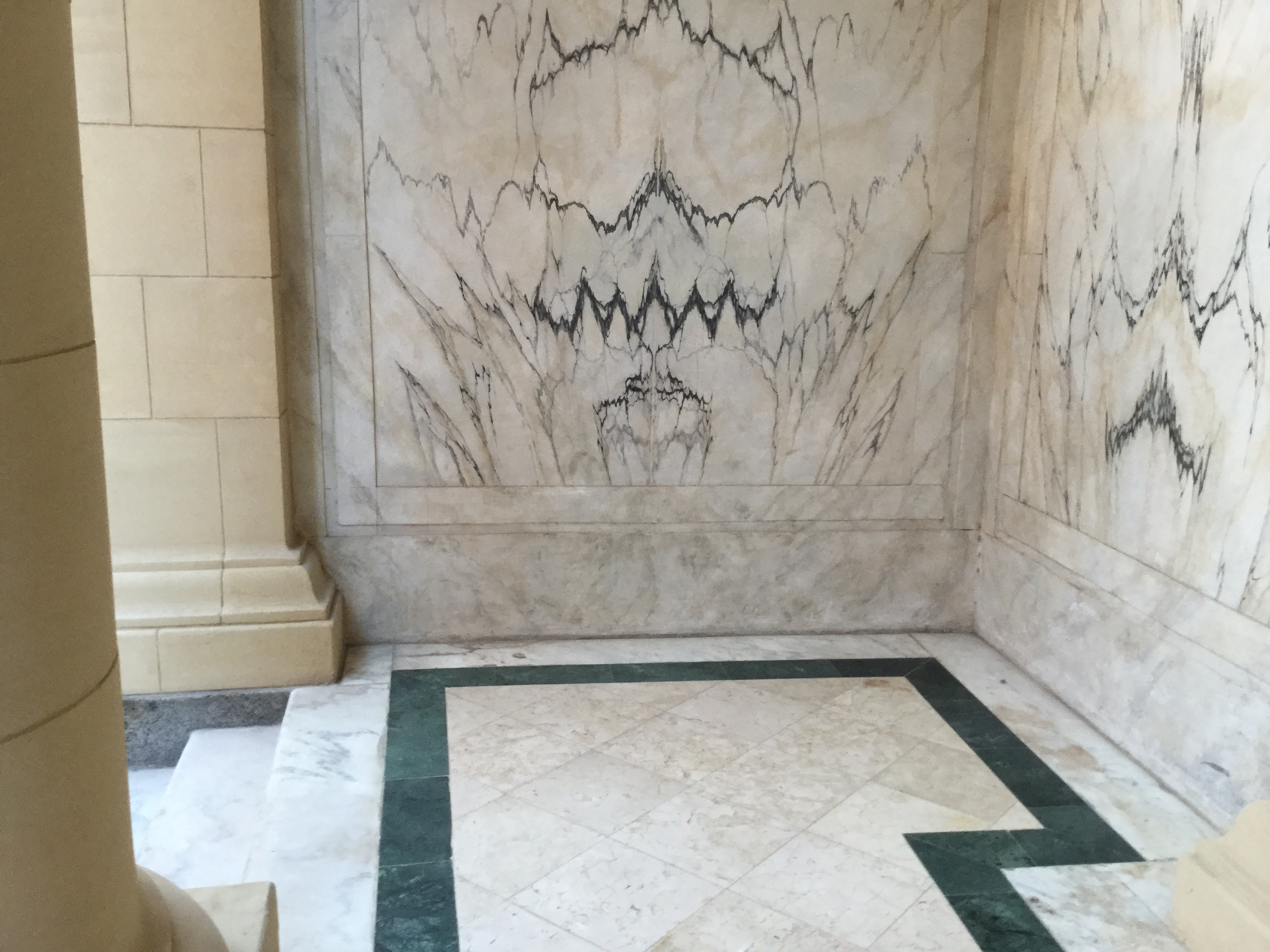

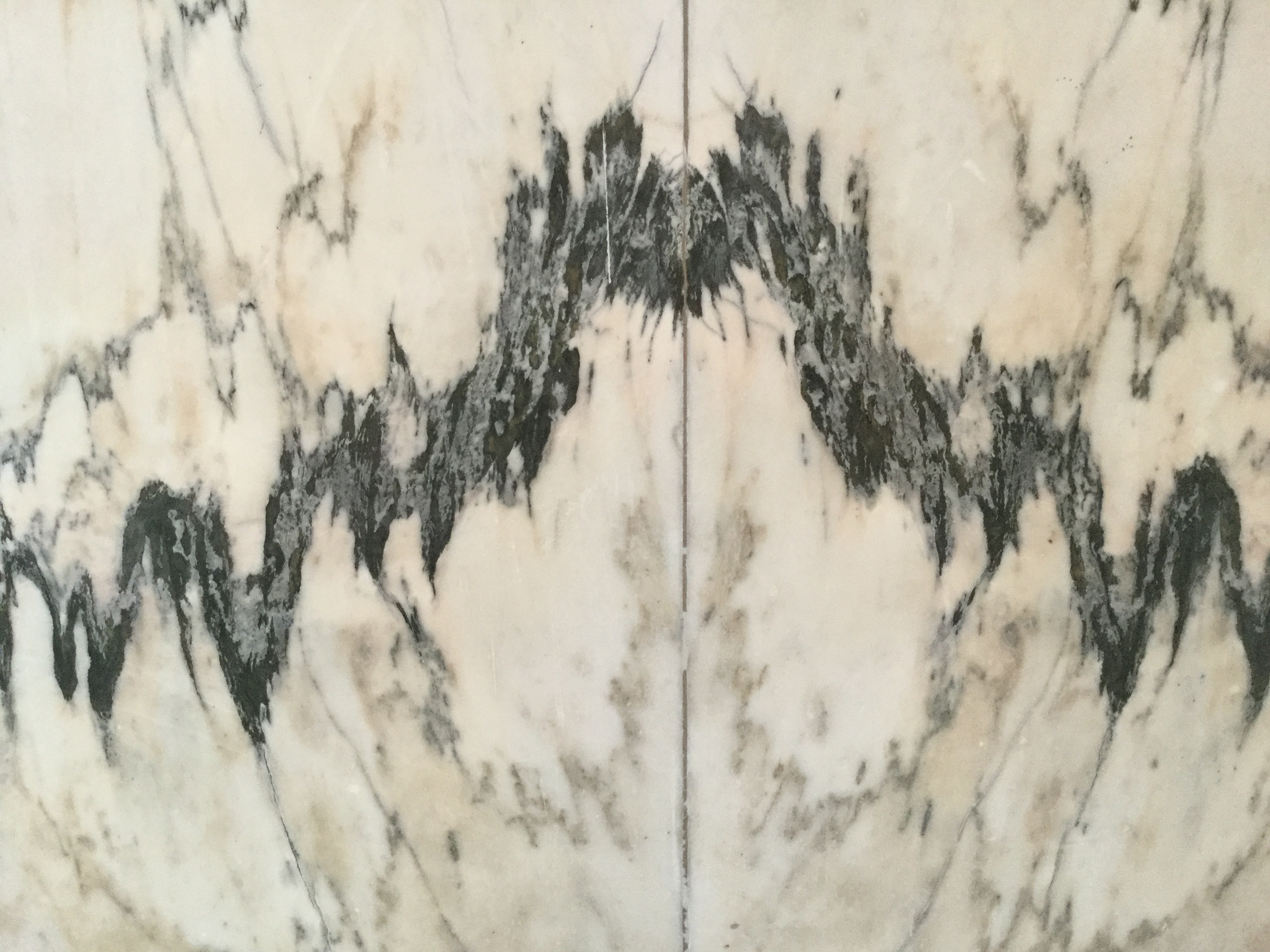

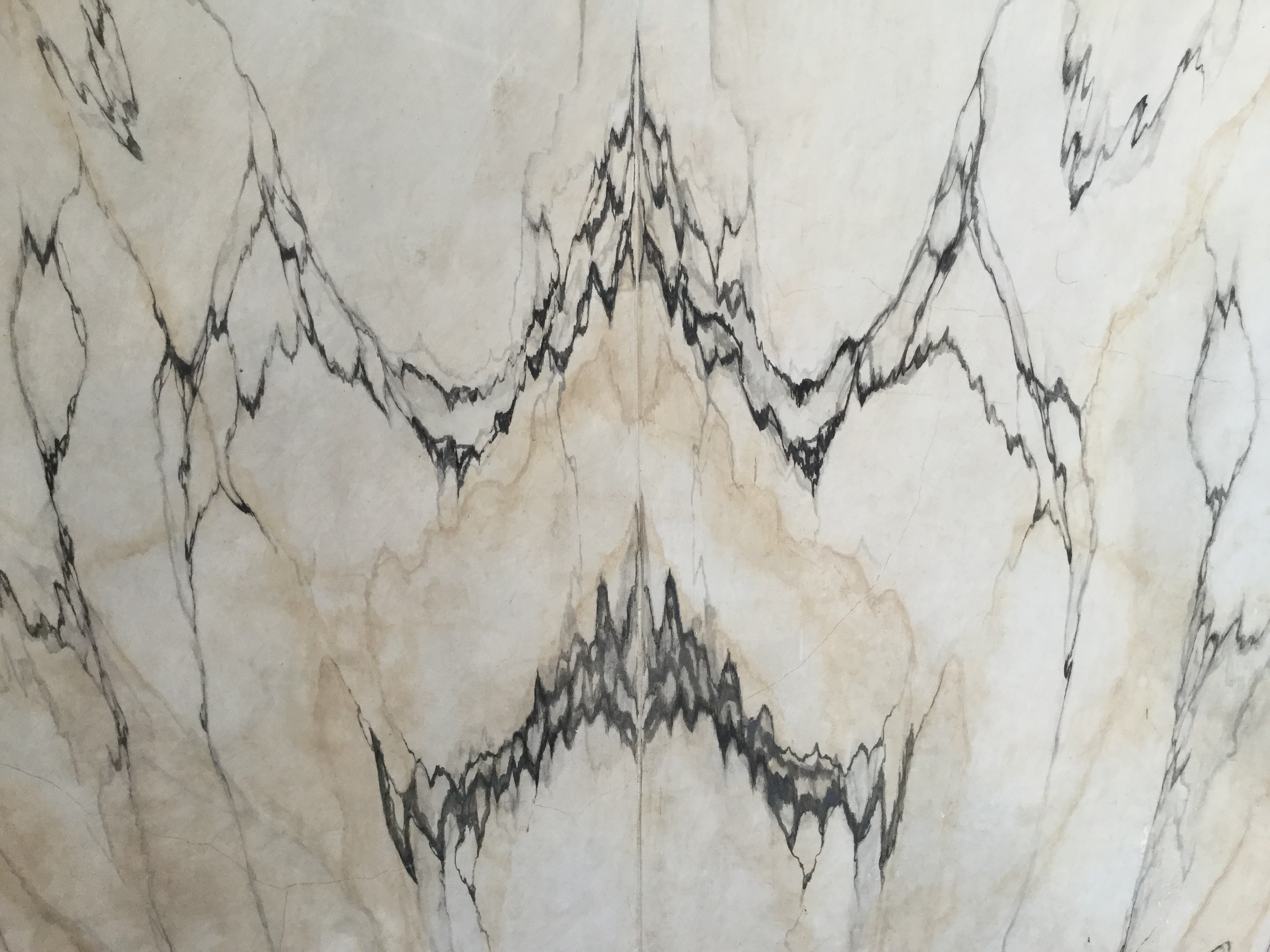

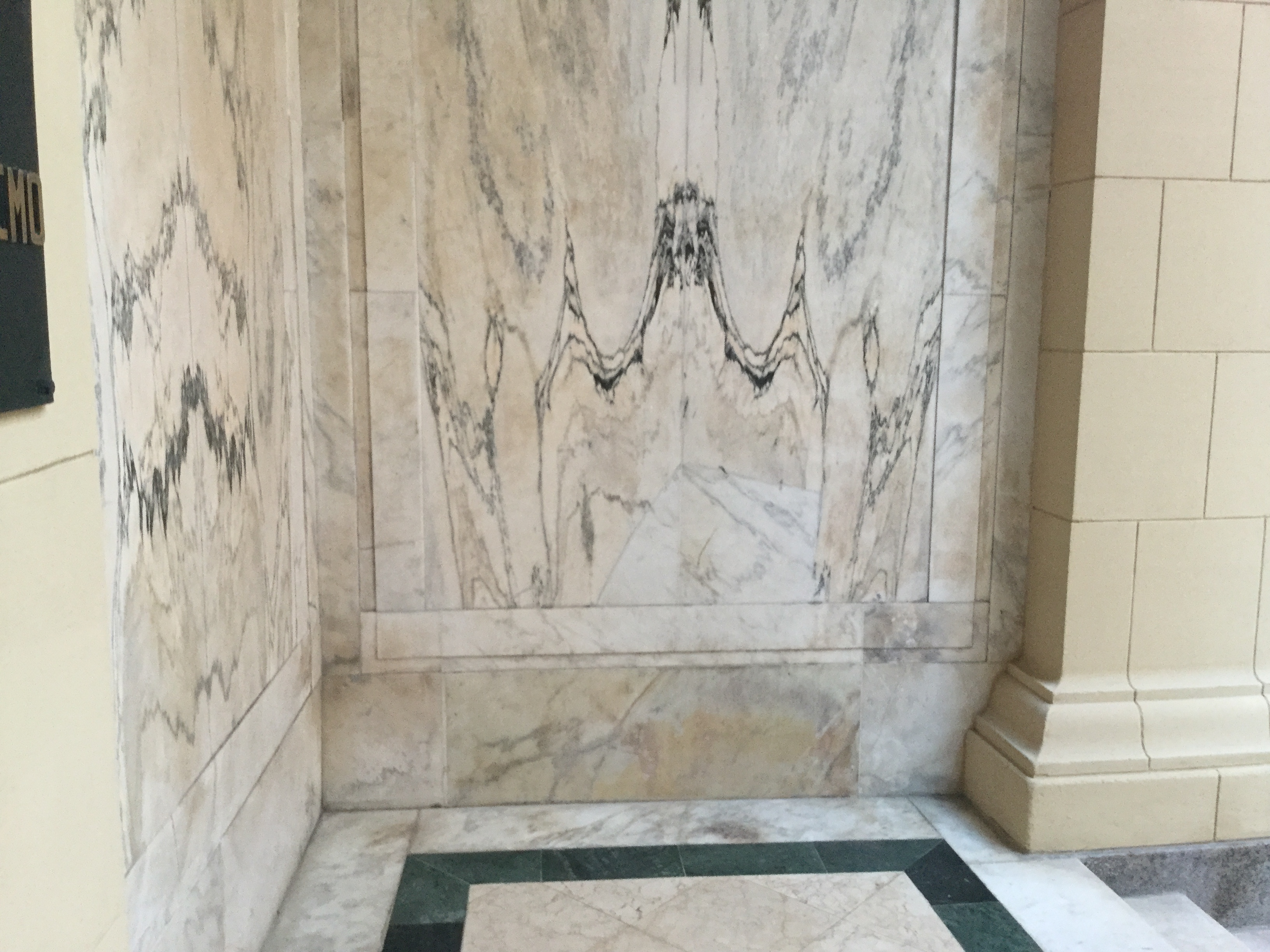

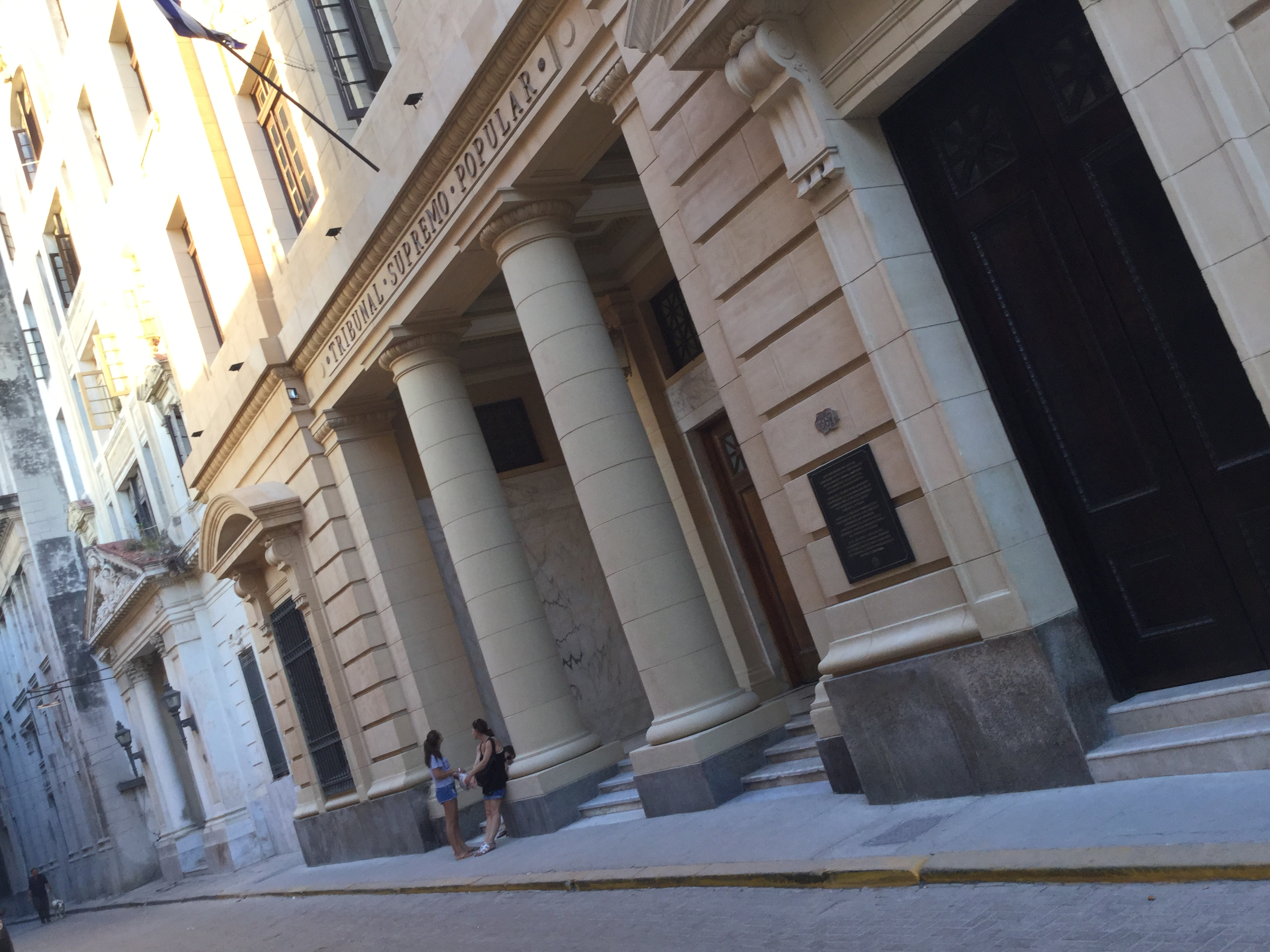

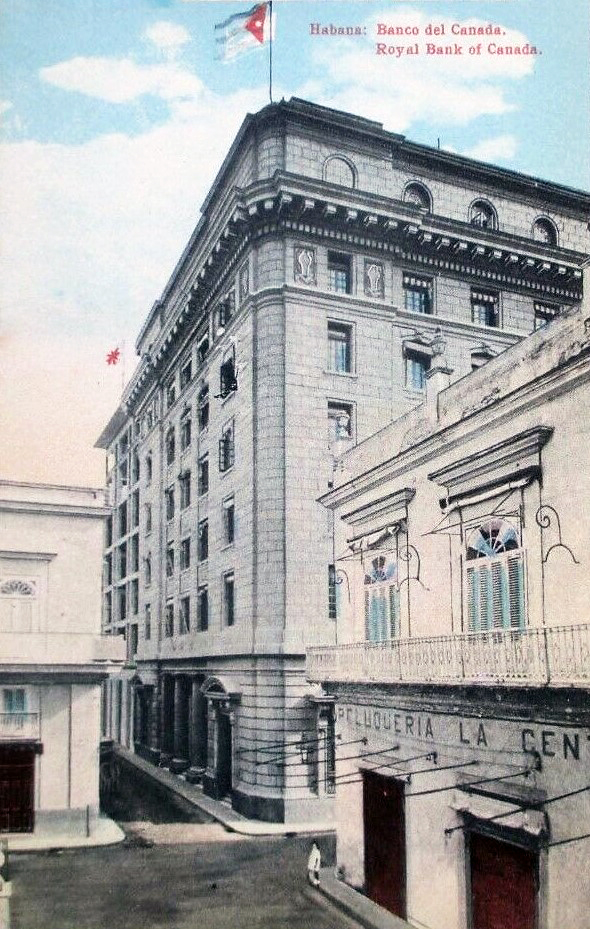
Bank Building shortly after completion

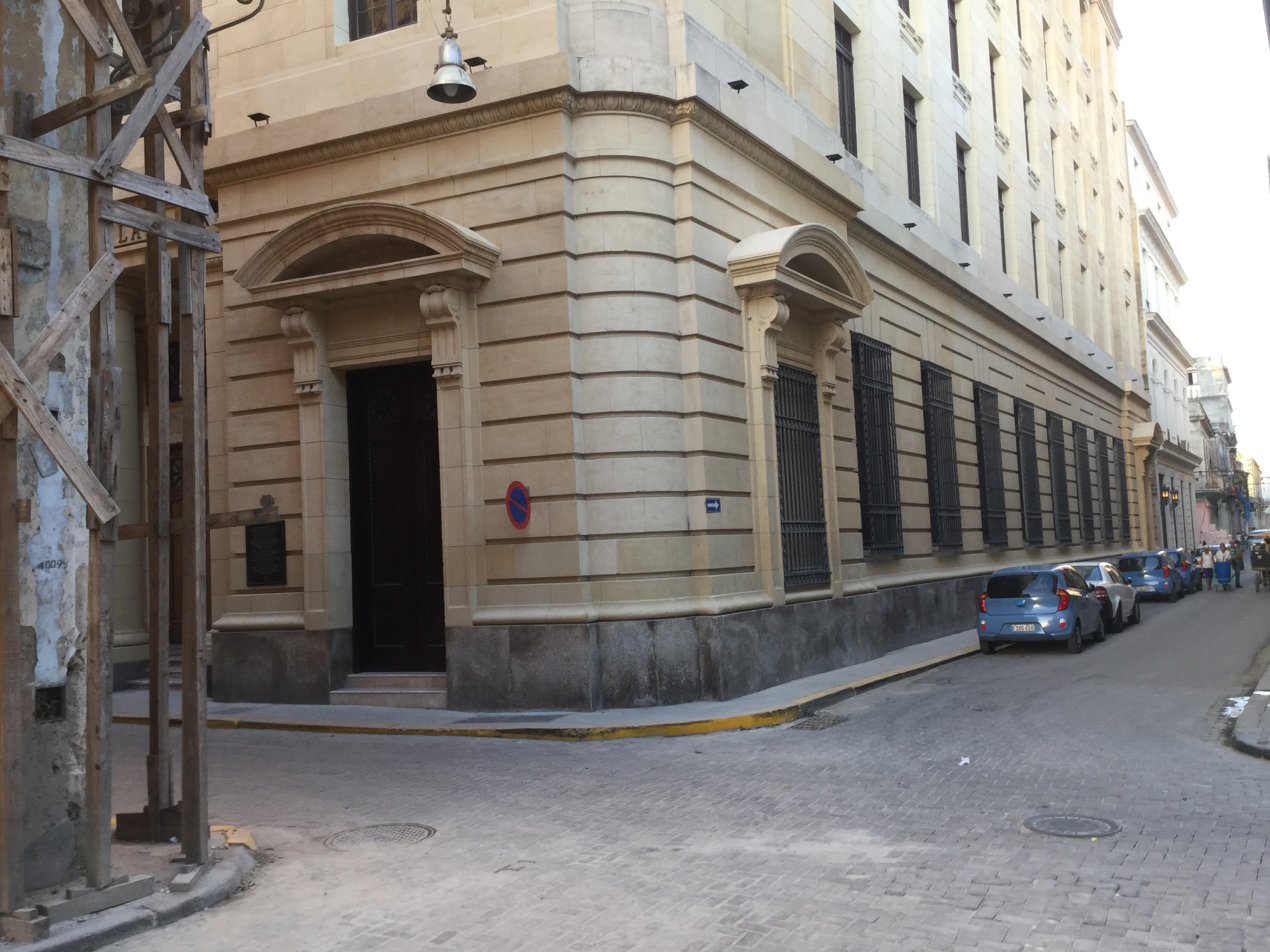

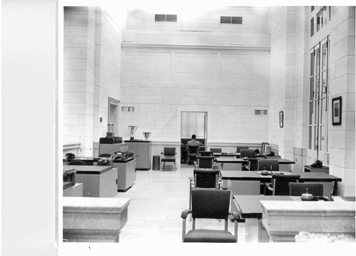

== See also ==
- Bank of Nova Scotia Building, Havana 1906
- List of banks in Cuba
