= Parti (architecture) =

Organizing thought in architectural design

In architecture, a parti is an organizing thought or decision behind an architect's design, presented in the form of a parti diagram, parti sketch, or a simple statement. The term comes from 15th century French, in which "parti pris" meant "decision taken."

The development of the parti frequently precedes the development of plan, section, and elevation diagrams.

== History ==
Producing a quick sketch (esquisse) of the parti was a critical part of architectural training at the Beaux-Arts de Paris during the 19th and early part of the 20th Century.

In architecture school during the 1900s in the United States, one would have understood the term ‘parti’ as the "main idea" for the planimetric layout of a building. Its roots in the American architectural education system are derived from the Beaux-Arts de Paris. The word "parti" refers to the concept of ‘parti pris’, and refers to the main ‘idea’ of the organizing principle that is embodied in a design and often expressed by a simple geometric diagram. The "parti" often expresses the essence of an architectural design reduced to its essence.

== Example ==
Lonja del Comercio building

The parti of the Lonja del Comercio building in Havana (in plan) is a perfect square and based on the classic 9 square problem that was used, (Note: "A primary protagonist was Rudolf Wittkower, who had published important essays on role of geometry in the works of Alberti and Palladio, essays later collected in Architectural Principles in the Age of Humanism (1949, 1962). The book includes Palladio's Geometry: the Villas, in which Wittkower argues that similar organizational schema underlie all the villas of Palladio. Wittkower's diagrams of the villas are variations of a three-bay by three-bay diagram; a nine-square grid. Wittkower suggests that Palladio's villas can be considered as a single conceptual project based on variations of an ideal plan diagram: “What was in Palladio's mind when he experimented over and over again with the same elements? Once he had found the basic geometric pattern for the problem ‘villa,’ he adapted it as clearly and as simply as possible to the special requirements of each commission. He reconciled the truth at hand with the ‘certain truth’ of mathematics which is final and unchangeable.”) among others, by Peter Eisenman to design some of his houses and Andrea Palladio in the design of many of his villas. (Note: "The nine-square grid and its progeny can be considered formative in the redirection of pedagogy in American architecture schools, although it was not a pervasive until the late 1970s with the diaspora of the graduates of Cornell, Syracuse, Princeton, and Cooper Union to more and more architecture programs." Ref: Kit-of-Parts Conceptualism: Abstracting Architecture in the American Academy.www.harvarddesignmagazine.org/issues/19/kit-of-parts-conceptualism-abstracting-architecture-in-the-american-academy)

== Gallery ==
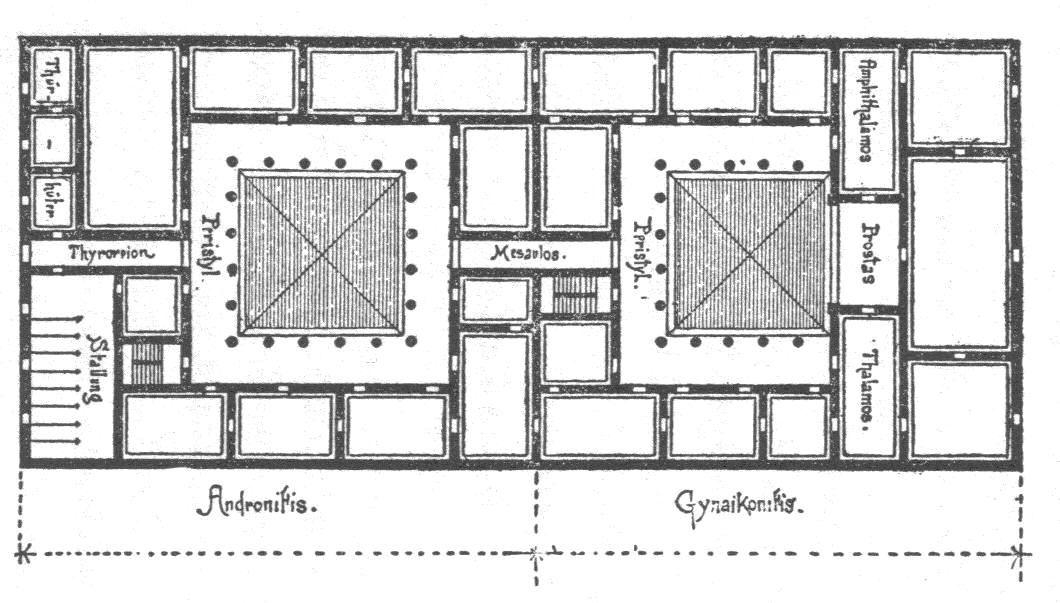
Roman house plan after Vitruvius

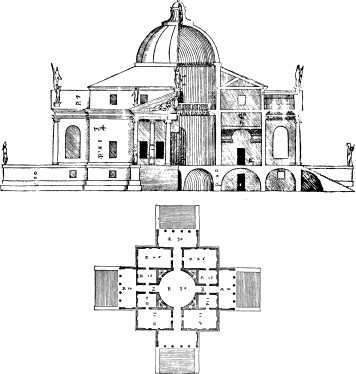
Palladio's plan of the Villa in I quattro libri dell'architettura, 1570

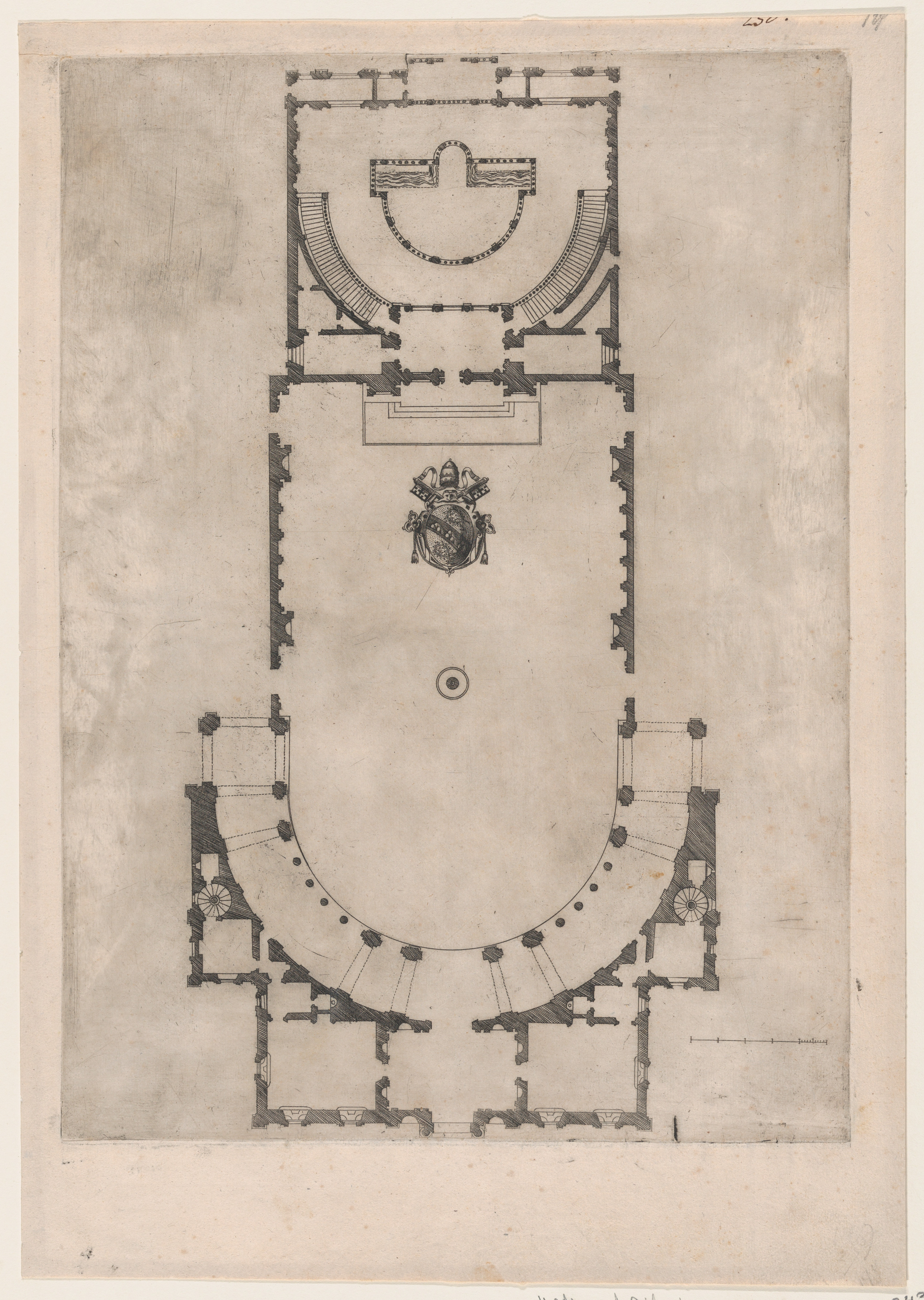
Giacomo Barozzi da Vignola

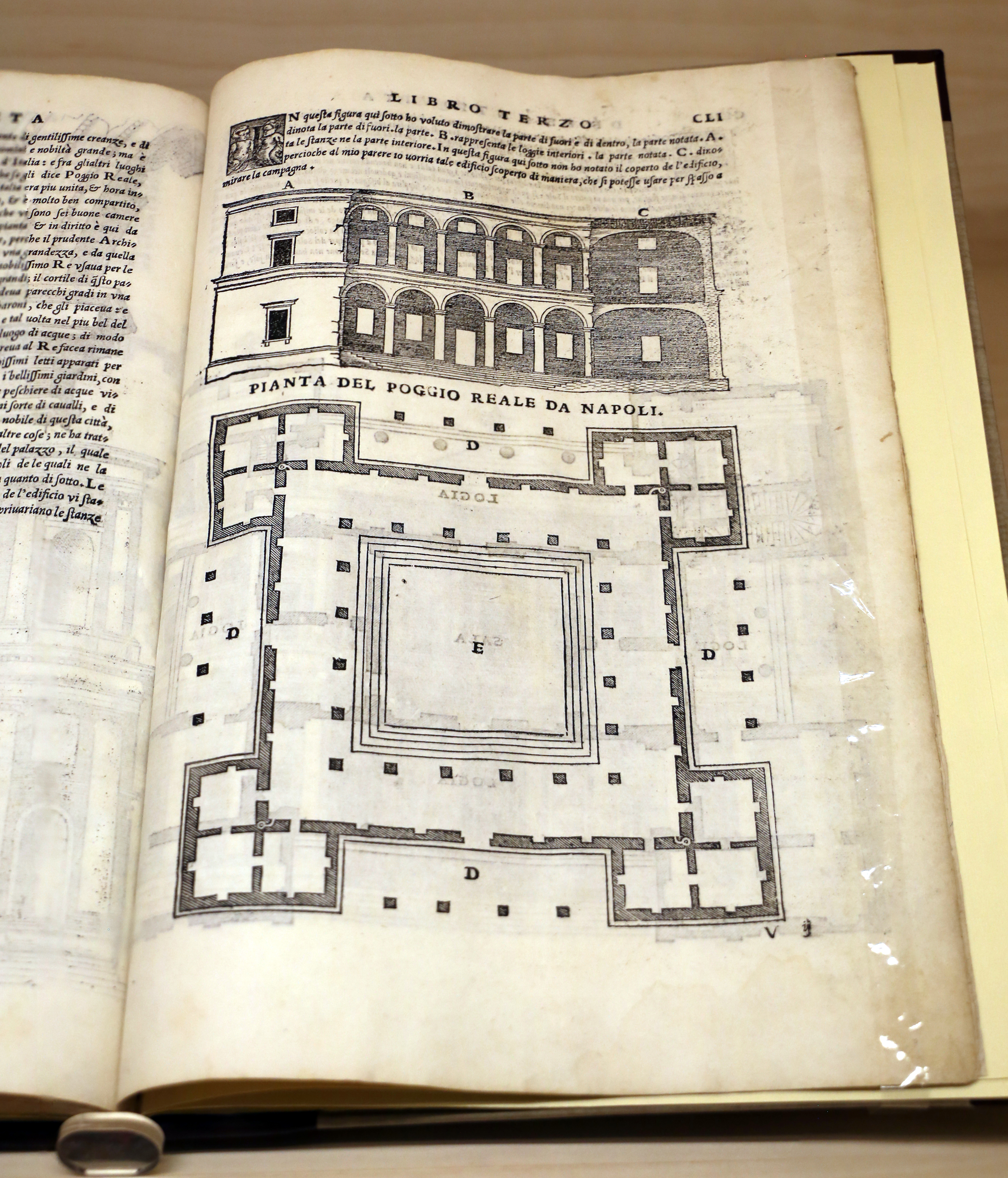
Sebastiano Serlio

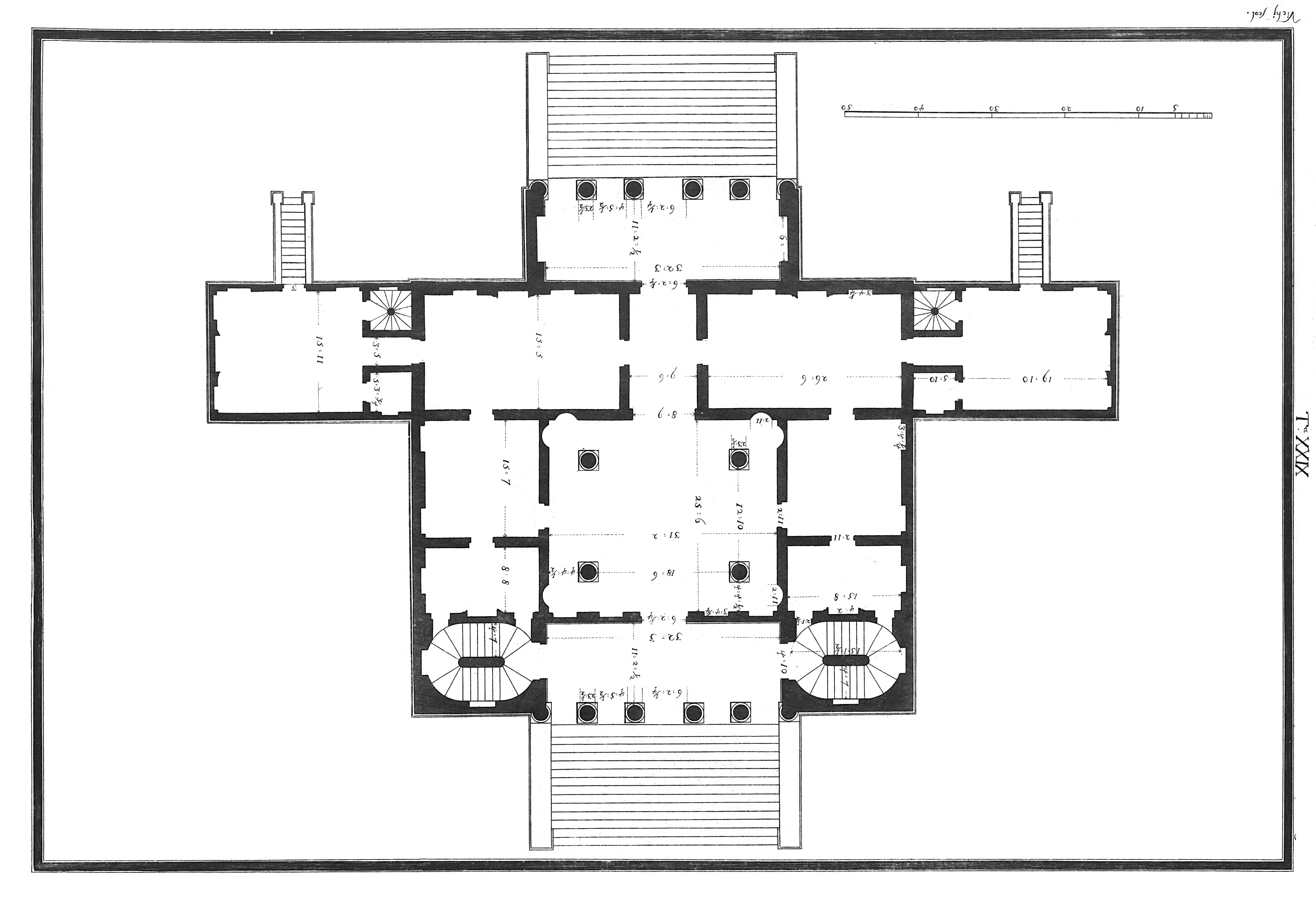
Plan of the Villa Cornaro

== Bibliography ==
- Colin Rowe, “Mathematics of the Ideal Villa,” Mathematics of the Ideal Villa and Other Essays (Cambridge, MA: MIT Press, 1976). First published in Architectural Review, 1947.
- Wittkower, Rudolf, "Architectural principles in the age of humanism," London, Warburg Institute, University of London, 1949.
