= Bank of Canada Building =

Head office of the Bank of Canada in Ottawa

Coordinates: 45.420877°N 75.702807°W

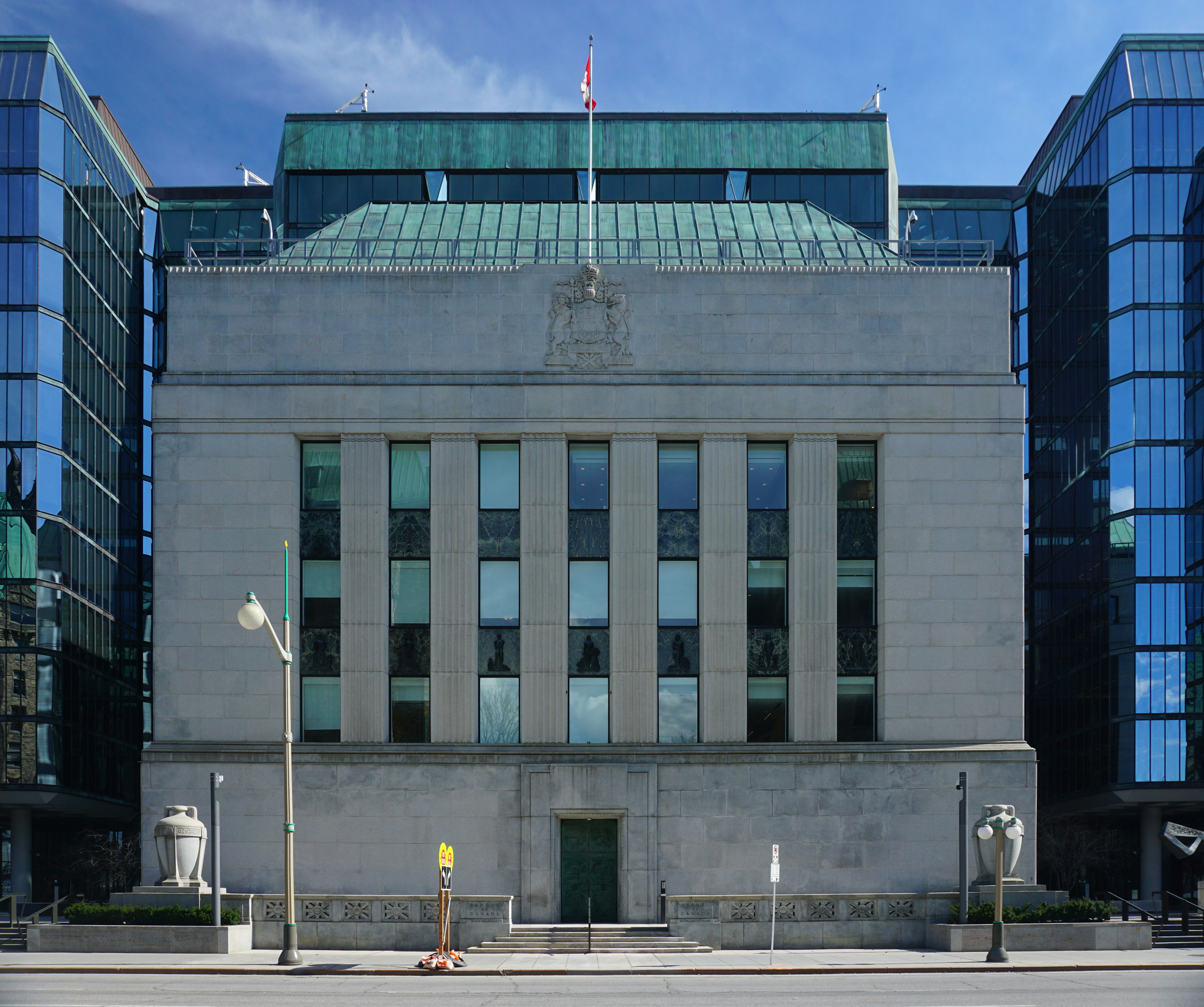

General information
- Type: Head office
- Architectural style: Late neoclassical
- Location: 234 Wellington Street, Ottawa, Ontario, Canada
- Opened: 1938; 88 years ago
- Renovated: 1979; 47 years ago
- Owner: Bank of Canada

Design and construction
- Architect: Sumner Godfrey Davenport

Renovating team
- Architect: Arthur Erickson
- Renovating firm: Marani Rounthwaite & Dick

The Bank of Canada Building is the head office of the Bank of Canada. It is located at 234 Wellington Street in Ottawa, Ontario, Canada.

== Description ==
It was built from 1937-1938 by architect Sumner Godfrey Davenport of Montreal, Quebec, and completed by the Toronto-based firm of Marani, Lawson and Morris. The Bank of Canada Building replaced the Victoria Building to the east of this building on Wellington Street.

It is constructed of grey granite from Quebec. It is late neoclassical in style, which was a very popular style at the time for banks. The Bank of Canada Building won a number of architectural awards, including the Gold Medal from the Royal Architectural Institute of Canada.

The large bronze front doors were designed by Ulysses Ricci of New York, and decorated with facsimiles of Greek coins from the British Museum. The sculptures decorating the front facade were designed by Jacobine Jones, and they represent Canada's seven principal industries at the time: fishing, electricity, mining, agriculture, forestry, manufacturing, and construction. The cornerstone was placed by Prime Minister Mackenzie King and the Bank's first governor, Graham Towers.

Plans for additions in the 1940s and 1950s were scrapped, and while more substantial plans were drafted during the 1960s, construction was delayed due to Ottawa's already-strained construction industry, and only commenced in 1972. The glass structure behind the original 1937 building was completed in 1979 by the firm of Marani Rounthwaite & Dick (successor to Marani, Lawson and Morris) and Arthur Erickson. The building contains an enclosed courtyard with a large tropical garden bordering a shallow pool, which is very popular with wedding photographers, and a three-ton Yap Stone.

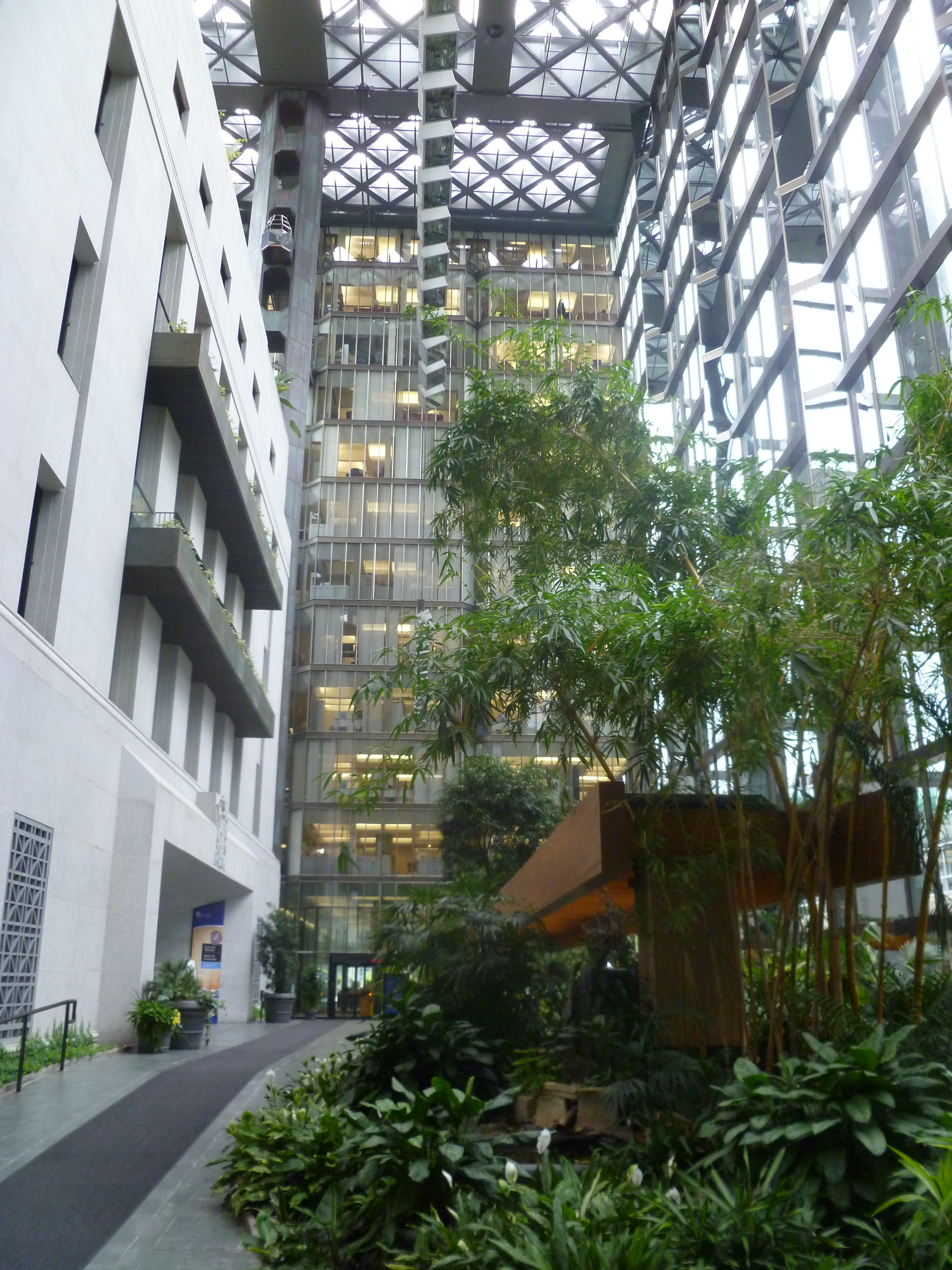
Atrium of the 1979 glass addition

In 2000, it was named by the Royal Architectural Institute of Canada as one of the top 500 buildings produced in Canada during the last millennium.
