= Sumner Godfrey Davenport =

Canadian architect (1877–1956)

Sumner Godfrey Davenport (November 6, 1877 – March 9, 1956) was an American-born Canadian architect who served as Chief Architect for the Royal Bank of Canada.

== Life and career ==
Davenport was born in Framingham, Massachusetts, and graduated as an architect from Harvard University in 1901. His first two decades were spent with firms in Boston and New York City. After working with the Royal Bank of Canada in 1917, he was hired by the Canadian bank to work in Cuba in 1920 and shortly after as Chief Architect.

Retired from the bank in 1942, he supervised projects with the bank until 1951. Davenport died in Georgeville, Quebec, in 1956.

== Projects ==
List of projects involving Davenport, either as supervising or primary architect, from 1901 onwards:

- Royal Bank of Canada Building, Havana, 1917

From 1920 to 1942, he worked on building branch buildings across Canada, with the exception of his own residence at 50 Forden Crescent, Westmount, in 1927.

- Royal Bank Branch Park Avenue at Bernard Street, Montreal, 1920
- Royal Bank Branch Tecumseh Road at Albert Road, Walkerville, Ontario, 1929 – active RBC branch
- Royal Bank Branch Atwater Avenue at 2753 Notre Dame Street, Montreal, 1933 – now Bui Optometriste
- Bank of Canada, Cornwall Street at 11th Avenue, Regina, 1937
- Bank of Canada Building, Ottawa, 1937–1938
- Royal Bank Branch St. Joseph Street, Quebec City, 1948
- Royal Bank Branch Van Horne Avenue, Outremont, 1949
- Royal Bank Branch Monkland Avenue at Grand Boulevard, Montreal, 1949
- Royal Bank Branch Simcoe Street North at Bond Street, Oshawa, Ontario, 1949 – active RBC branch
- Royal Bank Branch 5995 Decarie Boulevard at Van Horne Avenue, Montreal, 1950 – now police station
- Royal Bank Branch Portage Avenue at Edmonton Street, 1950–1951 – demolished

His most critical projects were two bank offices in Montreal and Vancouver:

- Royal Bank Tower (Montreal), 1926–1928, with York and Sawyer of New York
- Royal Bank Tower (Vancouver), 675 West Hastings Street, Vancouver, 1929–1931

== Personal life ==
Davenport was married to Virginia Hopkins in 1911. They had one daughter, Mary Daniels Davenport, who died as an infant in 1912.
