= Purdy and Henderson =

Engineering firm

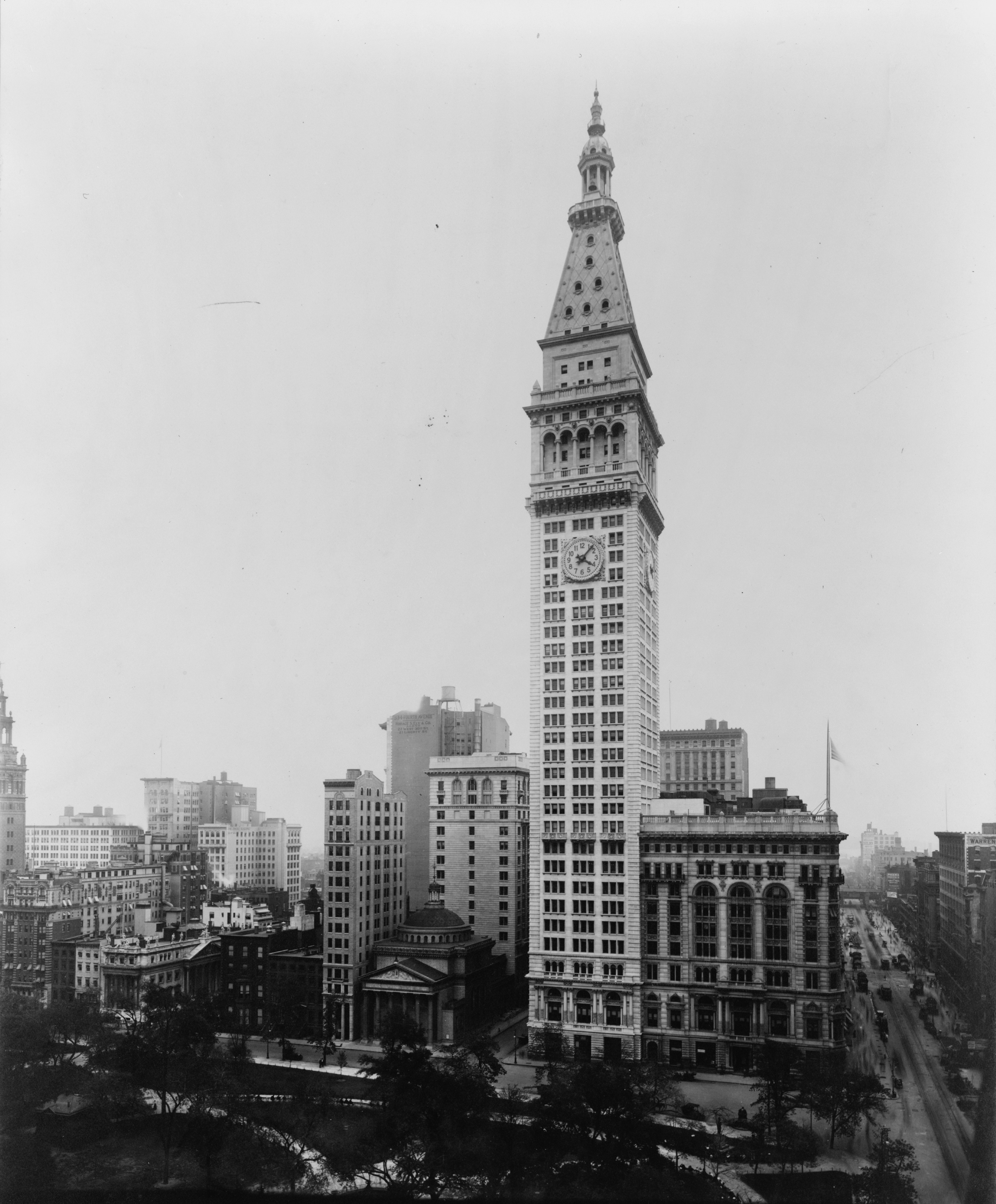
- Metropolitan Life Insurance Company Tower, 1911
- Trade name: Purdy and Henderson
- Type: Partnership
- Industry: Construction
- Founded: c. 1890 in Chicago, Illinois
- Founders: Corydon Tyler Purdy, Lightner Henderson
- Defunct: c. 1944 in New York, New York
- Headquarters: New York, New York, 1894
- Number of locations: Boston, Massachusetts; Chicago, Illinois; Seattle, Washington; and Havana, Cuba

Purdy and Henderson was a New York City-based engineering firm founded by Corydon Tyler Purdy and Lightner Henderson. They were active in the United States and Cuba between 1890 and 1944.

Purdy and Henderson was founded in Chicago, and transferred their headquarters to New York City in 1896. They eventually had branch offices in Boston, Seattle, Chicago, and Havana. Purdy and Henderson were a patron of the Seattle Architectural Club in 1910. Lightner Henderson died prematurely in 1916, but the firm continued to operate under the name of Purdy and Henderson well after his death. Purdy and Henderson, Engineers, collaborated with architect H. Craig Severance on 40 Wall Street, which for one month in 1930, was the tallest building in the world. The firm most likely closed at about the time of Corydon Purdy's death in 1944.

They worked on the John B. Agen Warehouse in Downtown Seattle in 1910 and the Royal Insurance Company Headquarters Building #2 in Financial District, San Francisco, among others. Purdy and Henderson designed several buildings in New York City, including One Times Square, Macy's Herald Square, and the Flatiron Building.

== Corydon Tyler Purdy ==
=== Professional history ===
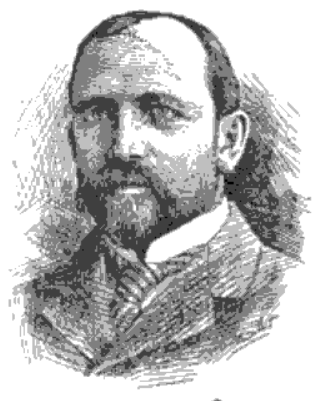
Corydon Tyler Purdy

Purdy had been a draftsman and surveyor's assistant in Chicago, Milwaukee and Saint Paul and in Chicago, IL, in the early 1880s. Purdy specialized in bridge design and applied these skills to skyscrapers. He worked as a structural engineer on the thirteen story steel frame of the Tacoma Building, Chicago, IL, (Holabird and Roche, Architects). Purdy and Henderson opened a New York City office in 1894 and moved its operations there by 1896. The New York City office designed the structure for the Waldorf-Astoria Hotel in New York, NY. (Schultze and Weaver, Architects, 1893-1897). In 1899, Purdy supervised the start-up of a New York office for his friend, George A. Fuller (1851-1900). (Purdy maintained a professional relationship with the Fuller Company.) By 1900, Purdy and Henderson had obtained consulting work in Havana, Cuba and produced important buildings there including El Capitolio and the Hotel Nacional. By 1910, the office had in addition to its New York office, four branches including Havana, Cuba, Boston, MA, Chicago, IL, and Seattle, WA. During the Depression, Purdy and Henderson were involved in a race to build the world's tallest building, an American structure taller than the Eiffel Tower. Purdy and Henderson closed after Purdy's death.

Purdy was a member, American Society of Civil Engineers; Member, Institute of Civil Engineers of Great Britain; Member, Western Society of Engineers; Member, Engineers' Club of New York; Member, University of Wisconsin Alumni Club of New York; Member, Arctic Club, Seattle, WA; He won the Telford Premium Medal, Institute of Civil Engineers, London, 1909.

=== Writings ===
Purdy was a writer and spoke at national events for professional groups like the Boston Society of Engineers. He gave keynote speeches and educational lectures at his alma mater (UW), Cornell University, and other schools of engineering study. Said Purdy:

The days of wooden bridges and buildings, and heavy masonry are numbered. Iron and other metals are rapidly taking their place. Engineers of the future must know the names and uses of the different forms in which iron or steel is produced, and they should know when a channel can be used to better advantage than a beam, and when an angle bar will serve better than a plate. In other words, they should well understand the particular characteristic of every form and shape of iron or steel which makes that particular form, shape, or kind most valuable in any given place or for any given use.

— Bulletin of the University of Wisconsin, 1894

Representative of Purdy's published writings are the following:

- "The Steel Skeleton Type of High Building" (Engineering News, 1891)
- "The Steel Construction of Buildings" (Bulletin of the University of Wisconsin, 1894)
- "The Use of Steel in Large Buildings" (Engineering Record, 1895)
- "Can Buildings Be Made Fireproof?" (Transactions of the American Society of Civil Engineers, 1898)
- "The Relation of the Engineer to the Architect" (Proceedings of the American Institute of Architects, 1904)
- "The New York Times Building" (Proceedings of the Institution of Civil Engineers, 1909)

== Lightner Henderson ==
=== Professional history ===
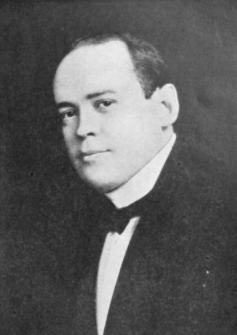
Lightner Henderson

Henderson worked in 1890 for an engineering firm in Cleveland, OH. Purdy and Henderson incorporated in 1901. After incorporation, Henderson became the President of the corporation from 1901-1915. Purdy and Henderson worked on several buildings on the Eastern US, and on projects in San Francisco, CA, and Seattle, WA. In about 1900, Purdy and Henderson had offices in New York City, Boston, MA, Chicago, IL, Havana, Cuba and Seattle, WA.

Henderson was a member of Western Society of Engineers, 1891-1916.

=== Education ===
Henderson attended the State Normal School in Millersville, PA. He obtained his B.S. in Civil Engineering from Lehigh University, Bethlehem, PA, in 1889.

An obituary by Corydon Purdy stated of Henderson:

His achievements of these years, from 1893 through two decades were notable, and mark him as one of the great structural engineers of his day. He was of a very retiring disposition and rather shunned the association of other men. On this account, he was not as widely known, and the quite remarkable character of the man was not as widely recognized as it would have been otherwise....Along with his analytical powers of mind, there was always a practical turn to it, which never was submerged by the complication or the laborious character of a difficulty. He did not arrive at irrational or impracticable conclusions. Simplicity was the distinguishing mark of his designing. It was these two qualities of mind combined that made him so successful in his profession.

== Selected commissions ==
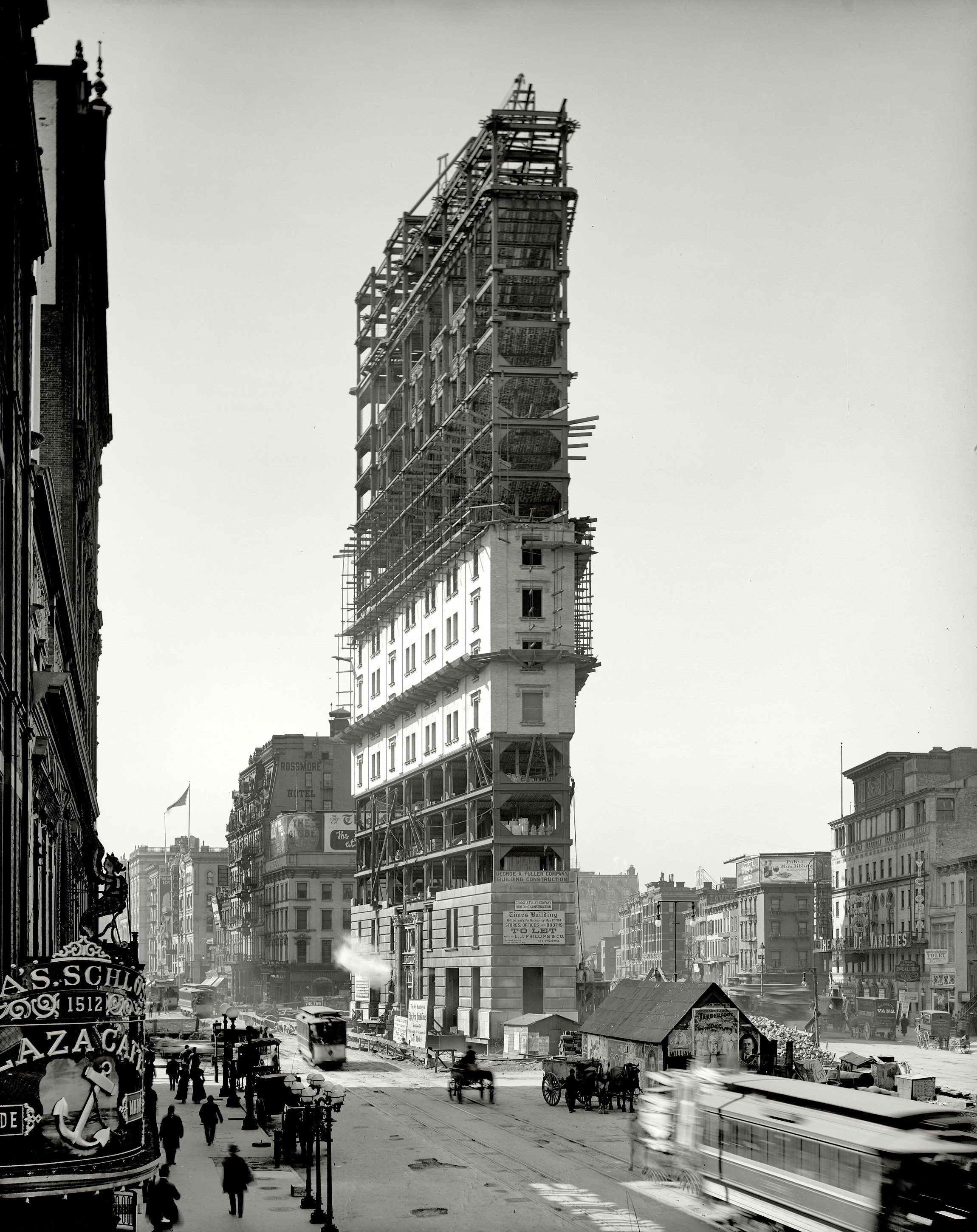
One Times Square, New York City, 1904

- 1902: Flatiron Building, New York, NY
- 1904: The Bellevue-Stratford Hotel Philadelphia, PA
- 1907: Macy's Herald Square New York, NY
- 1911: Metropolitan Life Insurance Company Tower, New York, NY
- 1919: Royal Bank of Canada Building, Havana, Cuba
- 1926: El Capitolio, Havana, Cuba
- 1930: 40 Wall Street, New York, NY
- 1930: Hotel Nacional de Cuba, Havana
- 1931: Starrett-Lehigh Building, New York, NY
- 1947: Radiocentro CMQ Building, Havana

== Gallery ==
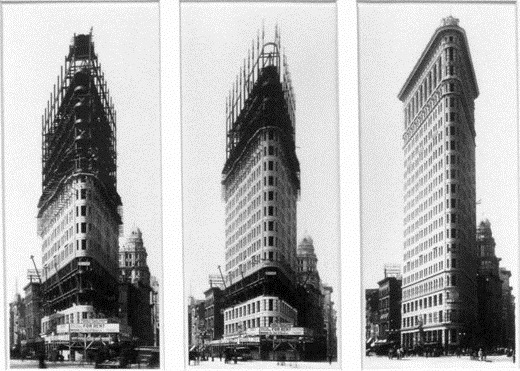
Flatiron Building construction, New York City, 1902

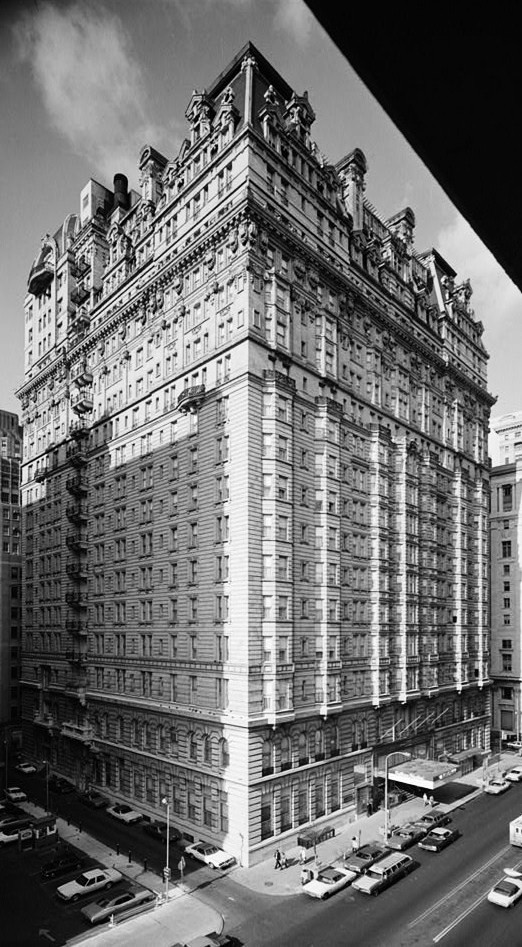
The Bellevue-Stratford Hotel. Philadelphia, PA, 1902

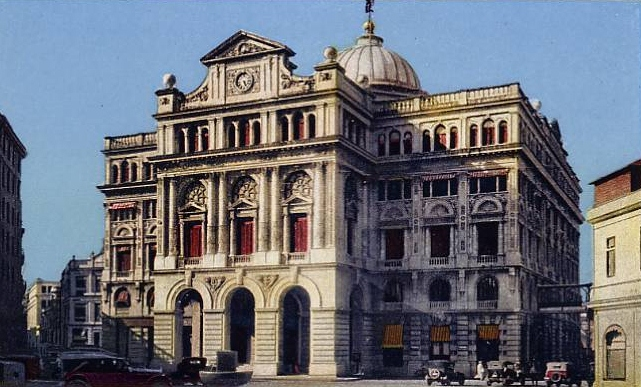
Lonja del Comercio building, Havana, Cuba, 1909

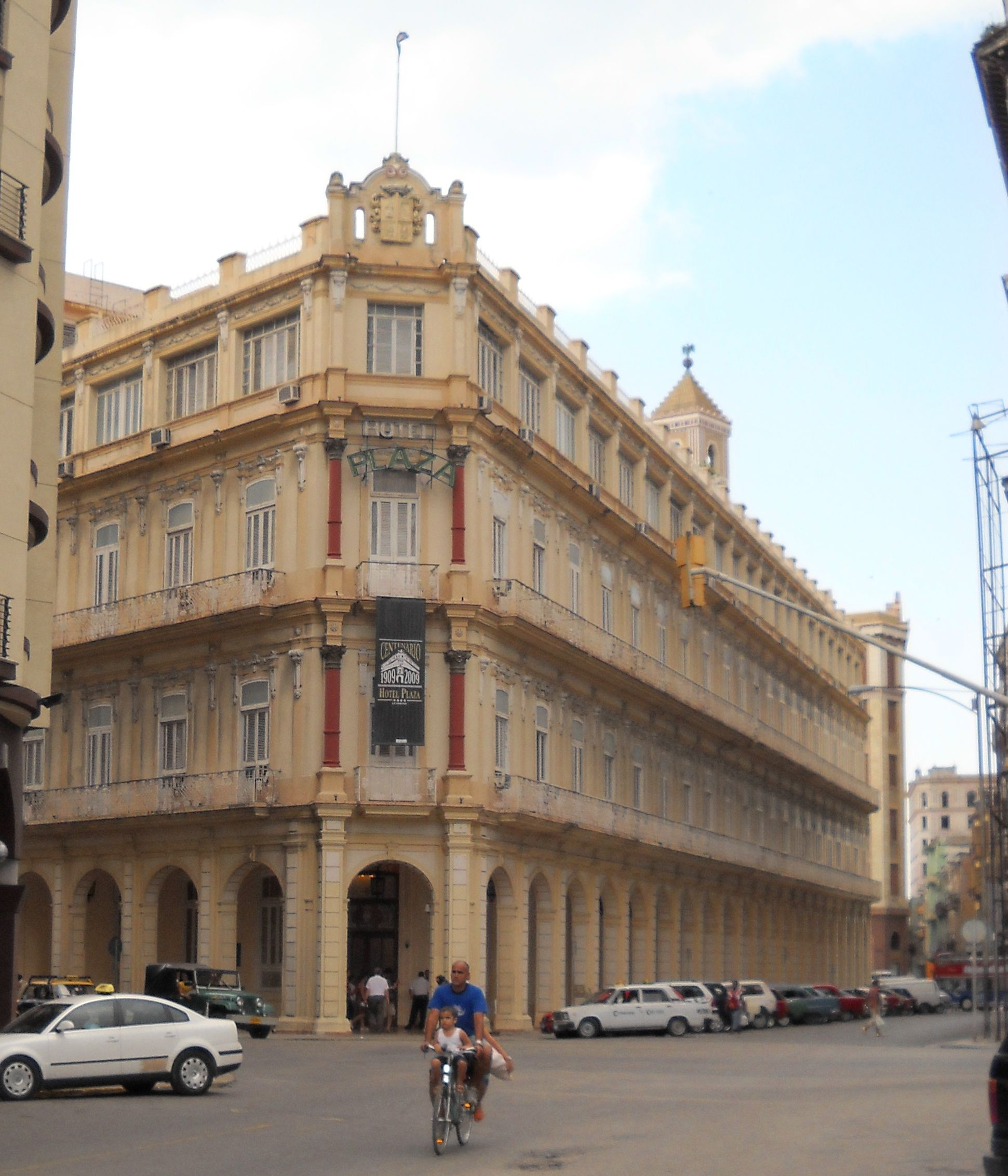
Plaza Hotel, Havana, Cuba, 1909

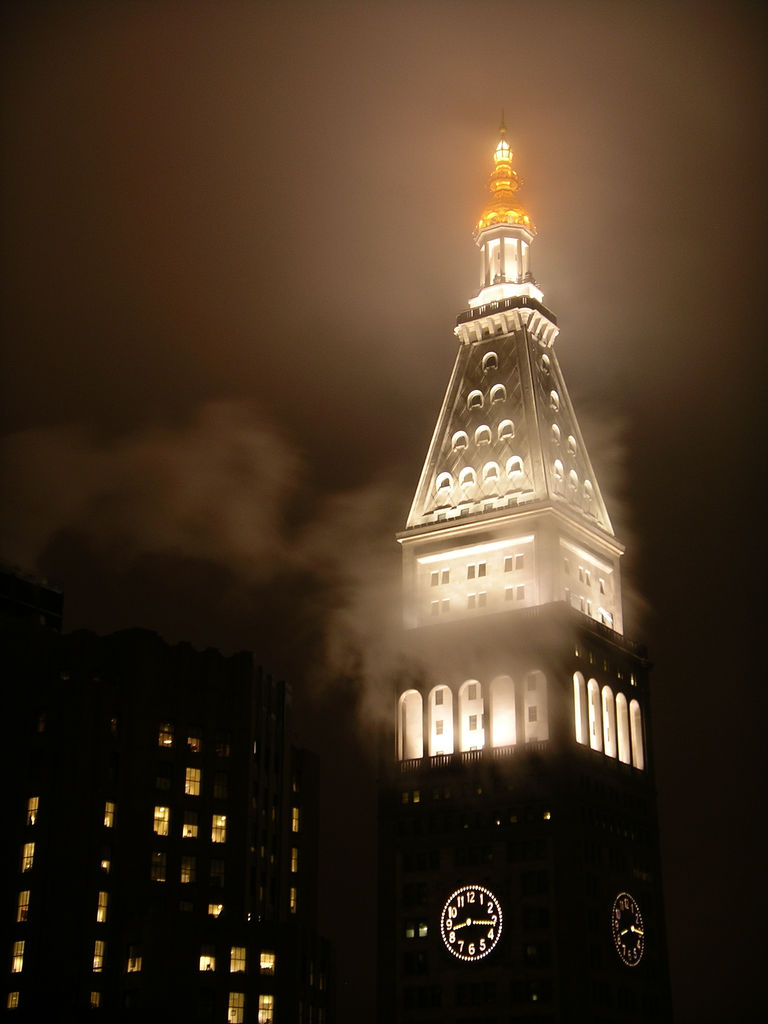
Metropolitan Life Insurance Company Tower, New York, NY, 1911

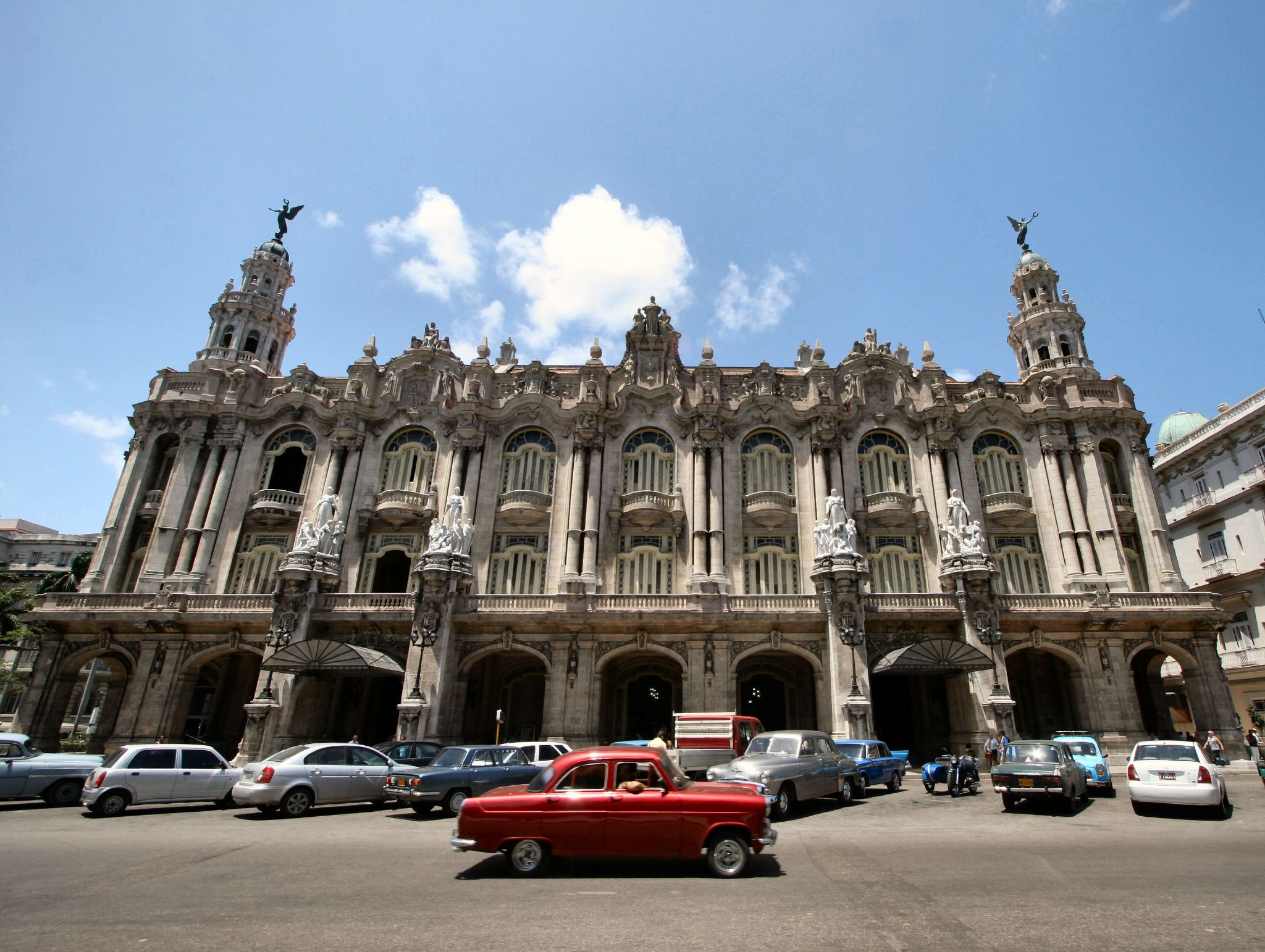
Centro Gallego, Havana, Cuba, 1915

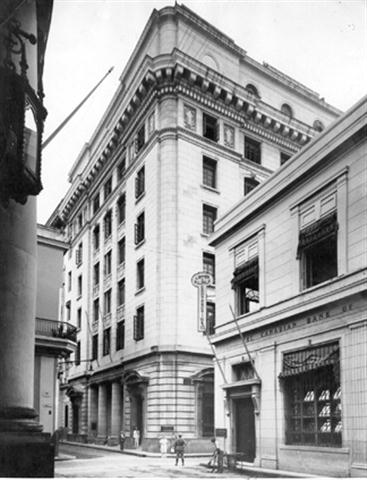
Royal Bank of Canada Building, Havana, Cuba, 1919

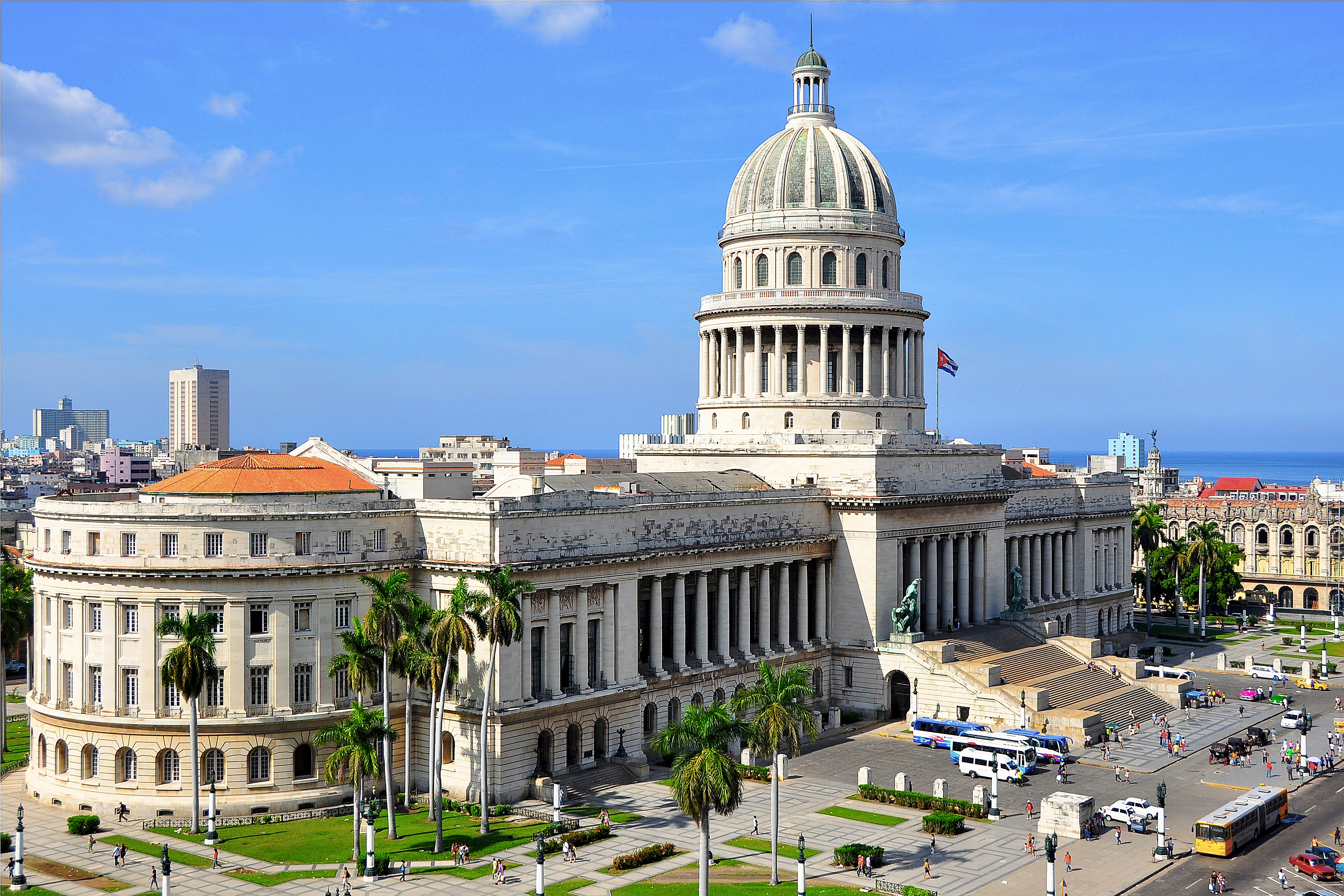
El Capitolio, Havana, Cuba, 1926

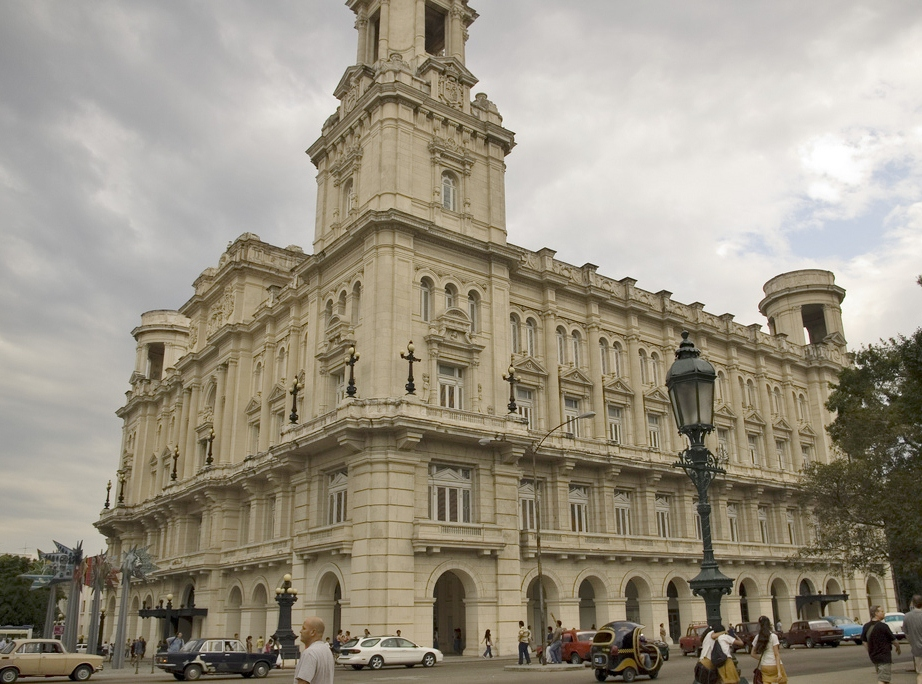
El Centro Asturiano, Havana, Cuba, 1927

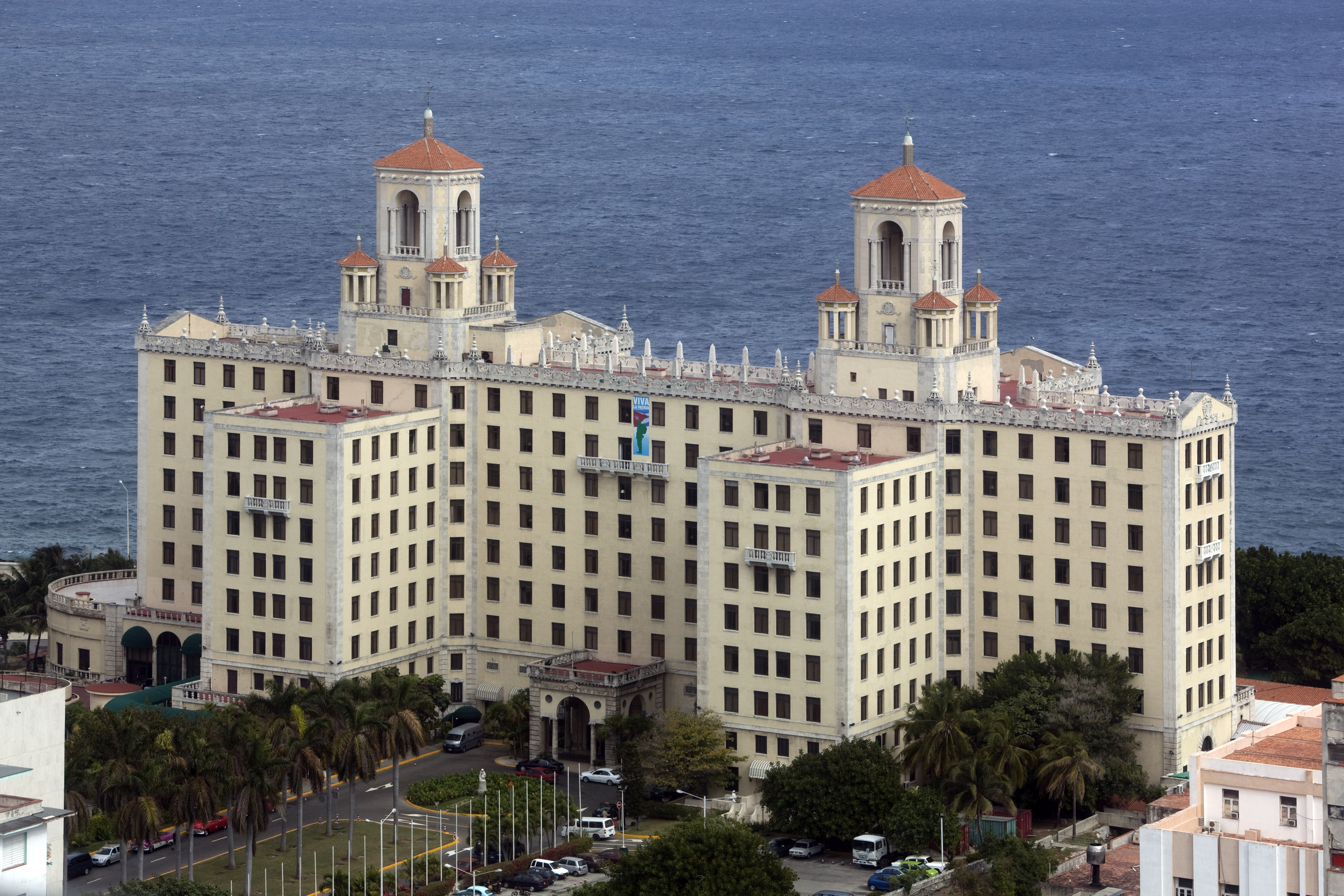
Hotel Natcional, Havana, Cuba, 1930

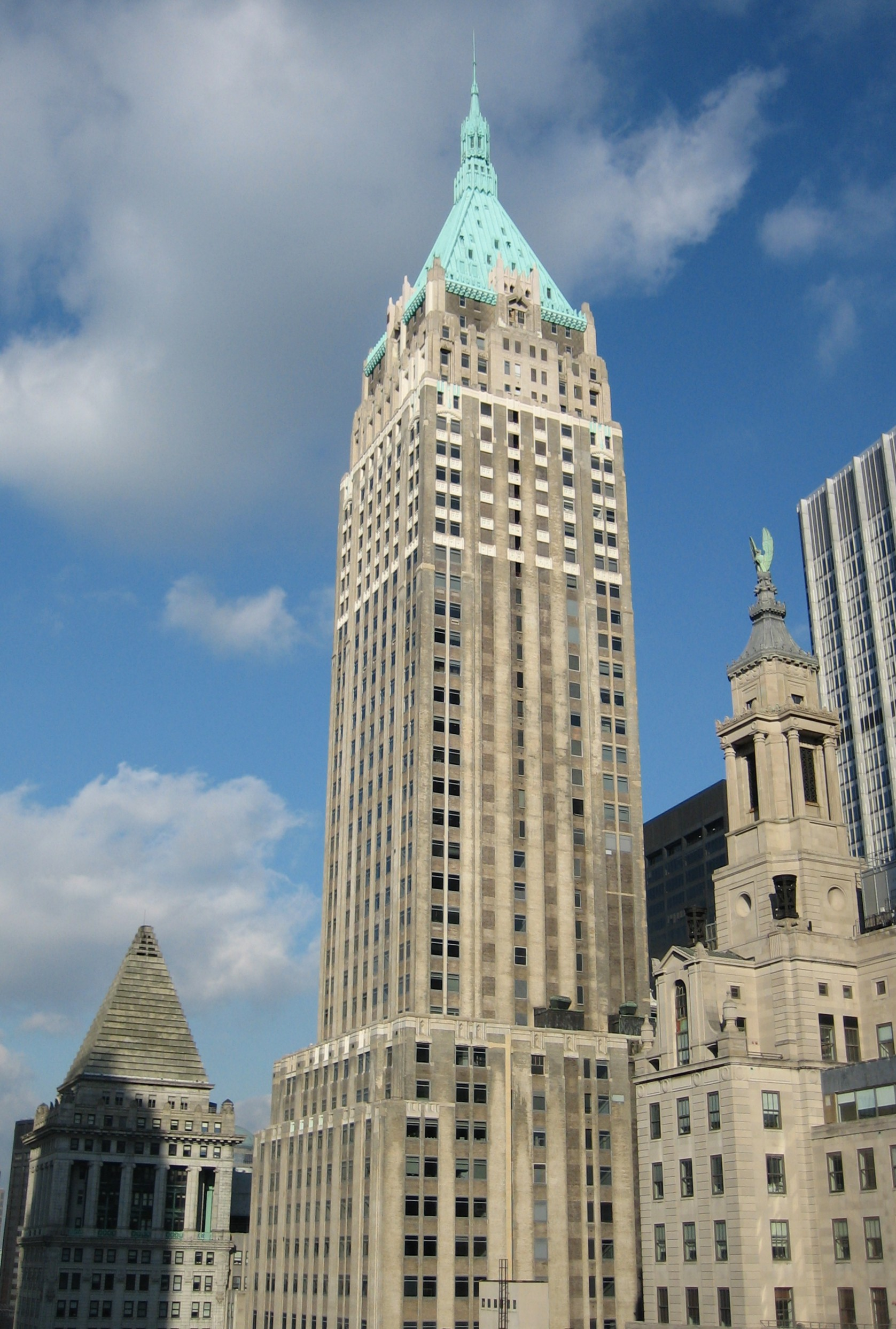
40 Wall Street, New York, NY, 1930

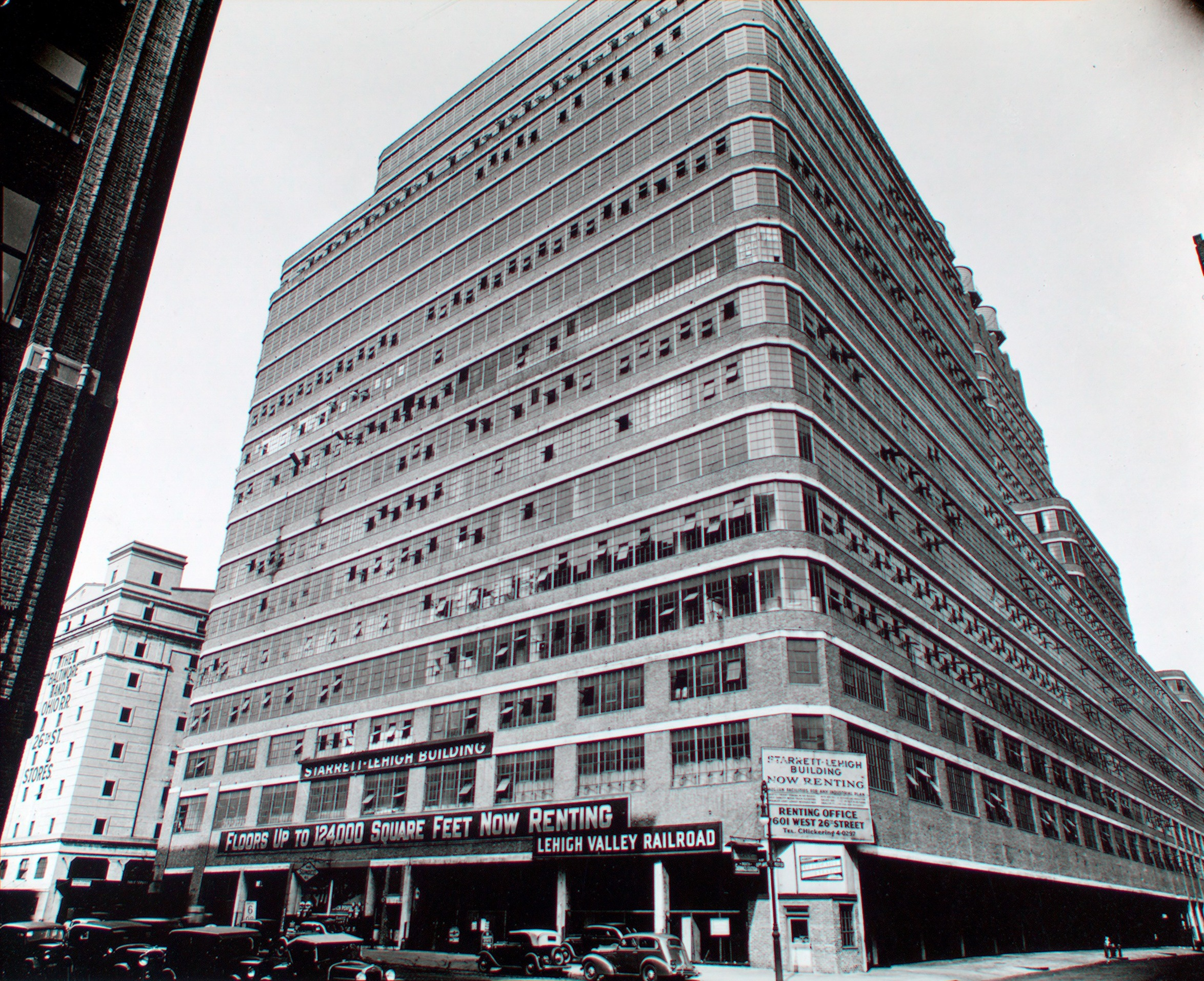
Starrett-Lehigh Building, New York, NY, 1931

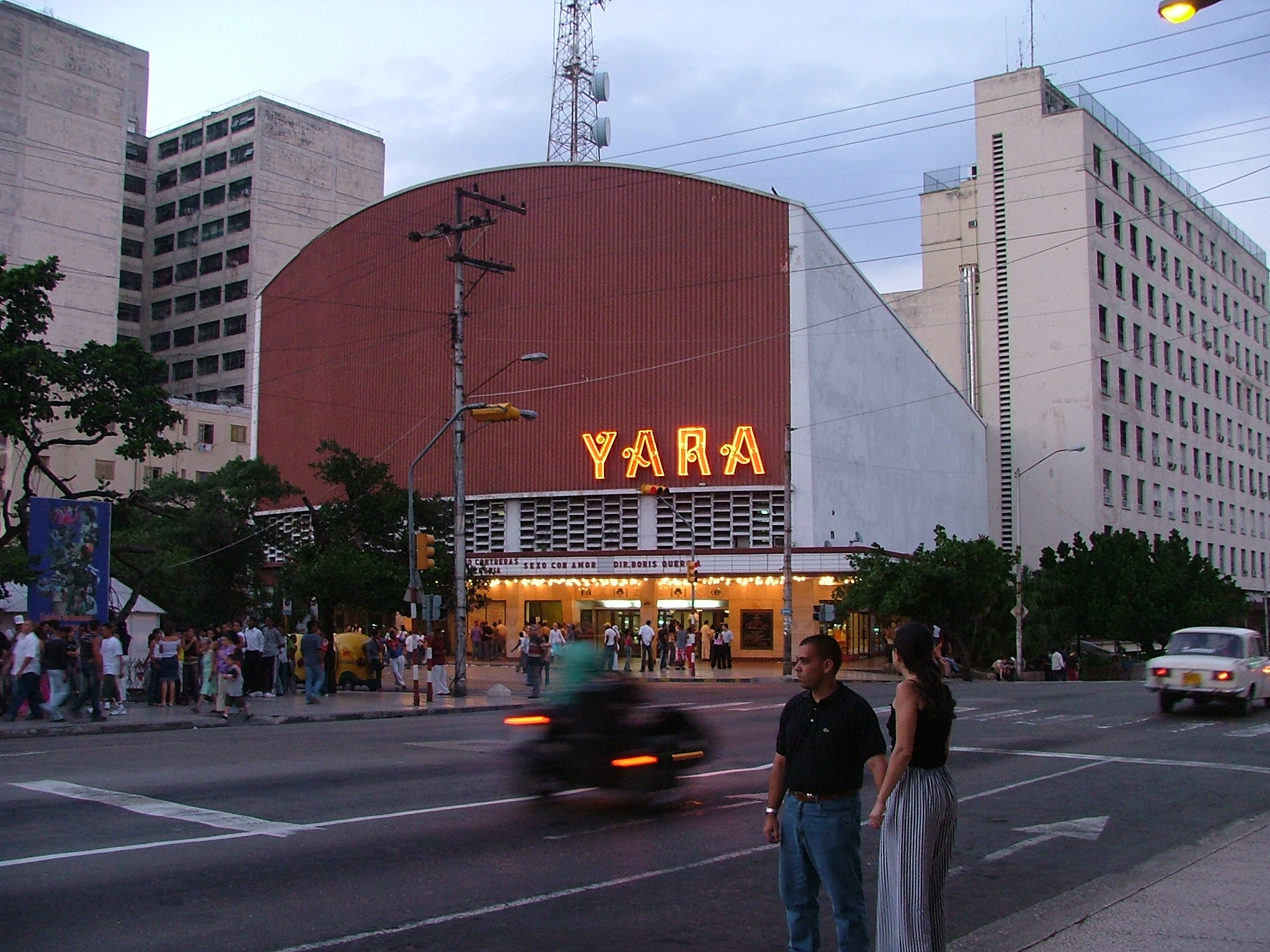
Radiocentro CMQ Building, Havana, Cuba, 1947
