= Lonja del Comercio building =

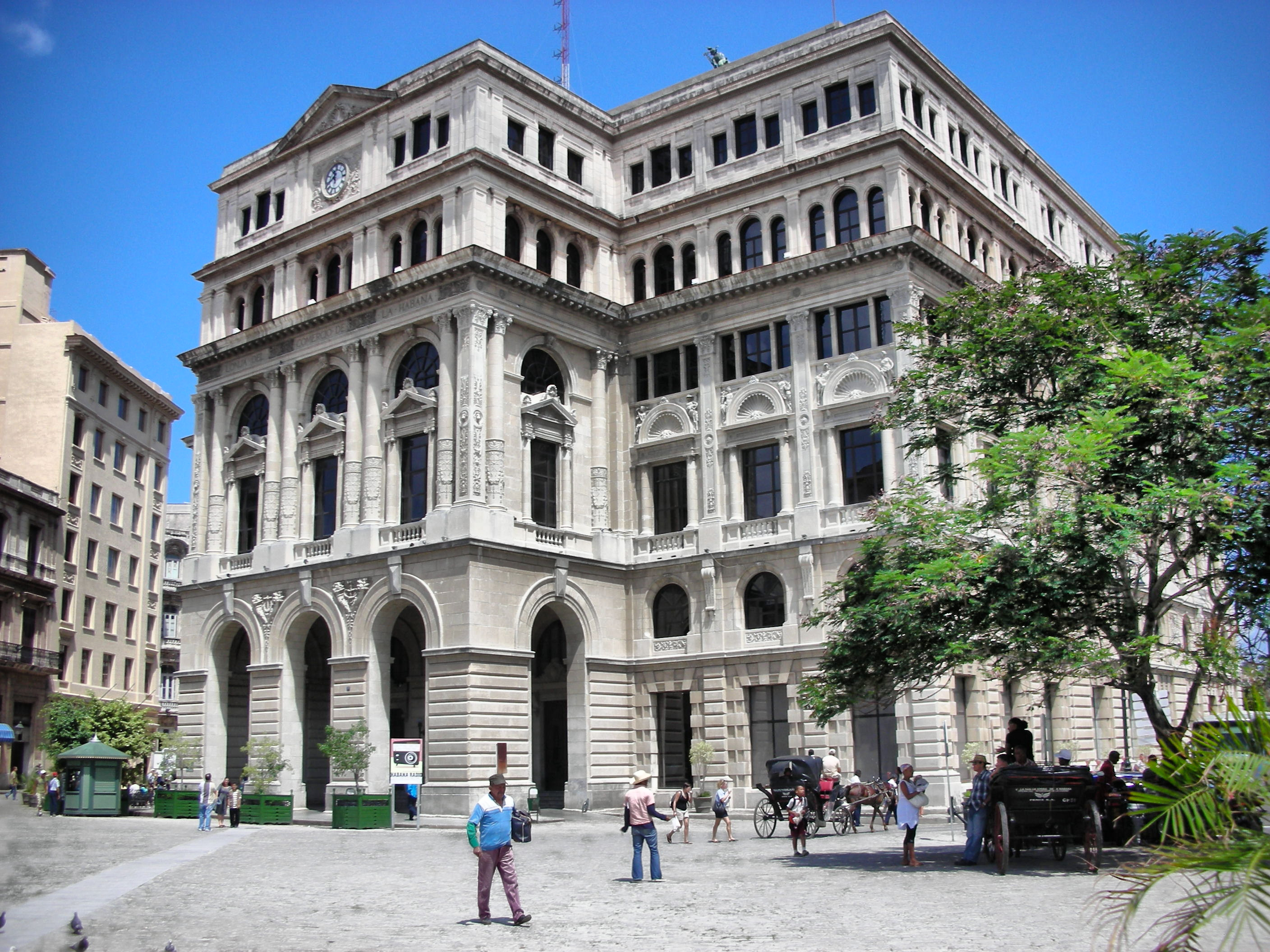
- The building in 2008
- Interactive map of the Lonja del Comercio building area

General information
- Type: Office
- Architectural style: Eclectic
- Location: No 2 Calle Lamparilla, Havana, Cuba
- Coordinates: 23°08′17″N 82°20′54″W
- Current tenants: City Historian's Office, Brazilian Embassy, various news agencies.
- Construction started: 1907
- Completed: 1909
- Opened: March 28, 1909
- Renovated: 1995

Technical details
- Structural system: Sreel frame
- Material: Masonry
- Floor count: 6
- Floor area: 2,235.50 m^{2} (24,062.7 sq ft)

Design and construction
- Architects: Tomás Mur, José Toraya
- Structural engineer: Purdy and Henderson, Engineers

The Lonja del Comercio (Commerce Market) building in Old Havana, Cuba served as the stock exchange in the capital until the 1959 Cuban Revolution. Today, it is an office building.

== History ==
The Lonja del Comercio first opened in March 1909. Set obliquely to the Plaza de San Francisco de Asís on its north side, it was designed in a mainly Renaissance and eclectic style as a commodities trading building. It is in close proximity to Basilica Menor de San Francisco de Asis. The dome is crowned by a bronze statue of Mercury, a replica of the original work of the messenger god by Flemish artist Giovanni Bologna.

== Architecture ==
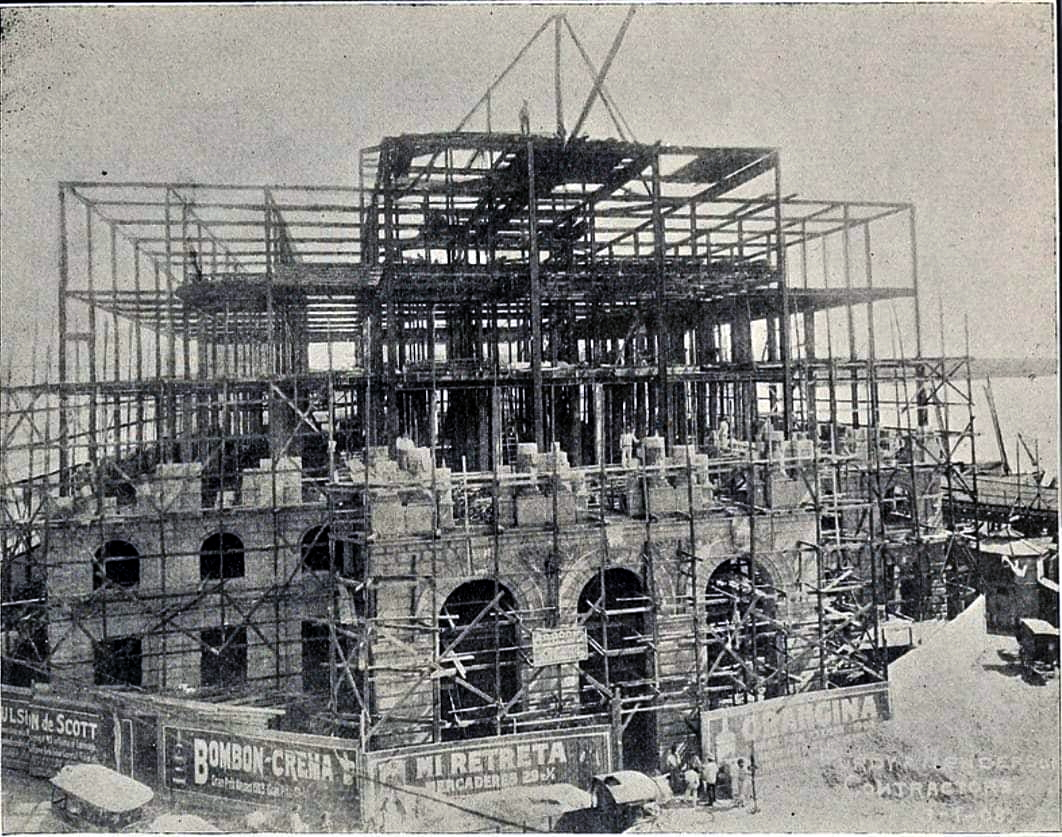
Lonja del Comercio building, Havana, Cuba_under construction

The construction of the Lonja del Comercio began in 1907 and ended in 1909. The building has a stone facing and a steel frame. It was designed by architects Thomas Mur and Jose Toraya, the structural engineers were the U.S. company Purdy and Henderson, engineers for many important Havana buildings including the Hotel Nacional, the National Theatre of Cuba, El Capitolio building, the Gran Teatro de La Habana and the 1947 Radiocentro CMQ Building by the architect Martín Domínguez Esteban who also designed the FOCSA Building in 1956.

== Parti pris ==
Lonja del Comercio building floor plan showing 9 square parti-pris.

The Parti pris of the Lonja del Comercio building in plan is a perfect square and based on the classic 9 square cube problem that was used, (Note: "A primary protagonist was Rudolf Wittkower, who had published important essays on role of geometry in the works of Alberti and Palladio, essays later collected in Architectural Principles in the Age of Humanism (1949, 1962). The book includes Palladio's Geometry: the Villas, in which Wittkower argues that similar organizational schema underlie all the villas of Palladio. Wittkower's diagrams of the villas are variations of a three-bay by three-bay diagram; a nine-square grid. Wittkower suggests that Palladio's villas can be considered as a single conceptual project based on variations of an ideal plan diagram: “What was in Palladio's mind when he experimented over and over again with the same elements? Once he had found the basic geometric pattern for the problem ‘villa,’ he adapted it as clearly and as simply as possible to the special requirements of each commission. He reconciled the truth at hand with the ‘certain truth’ of mathematics which is final and unchangeable.”) among others, by Peter Eisenman to design some of his houses and Andrea Palladio in the design of many of his villas. (Note: "The nine-square grid and its progeny can be considered formative in the redirection of pedagogy in American architecture schools, although it was not a pervasive until the late 1970s with the diaspora of the graduates of Cornell, Syracuse, Princeton, and Cooper Union to more and more architecture programs." Ref: Kit-of-Parts Conceptualism: Abstracting Architecture in the American Academy. www.harvarddesignmagazine.org/issues/19/kit-of-parts-conceptualism-abstracting-architecture-in-the-american-academy) The five-storey building has a steel frame structure. In 1939, an additional floor was added. The ground floor was originally used for warehouses and the stock market, the 2nd and 3rd floors provided office space, while the 4th and 5th floors, which adopted more sober ornamentation, were leased to customs brokers and trading companies.

== Renovation ==
After the Cuban Revolution, the Lonja del Comercio building suffered architectural deterioration through neglect. Although the Lonja del Comercio building was part of a capital rehabilitation program that was carried out in 1995 by the Office of the City Historian, in 1989 there is little indication that other similar buildings will be saved at least in the near future.

== Gallery ==
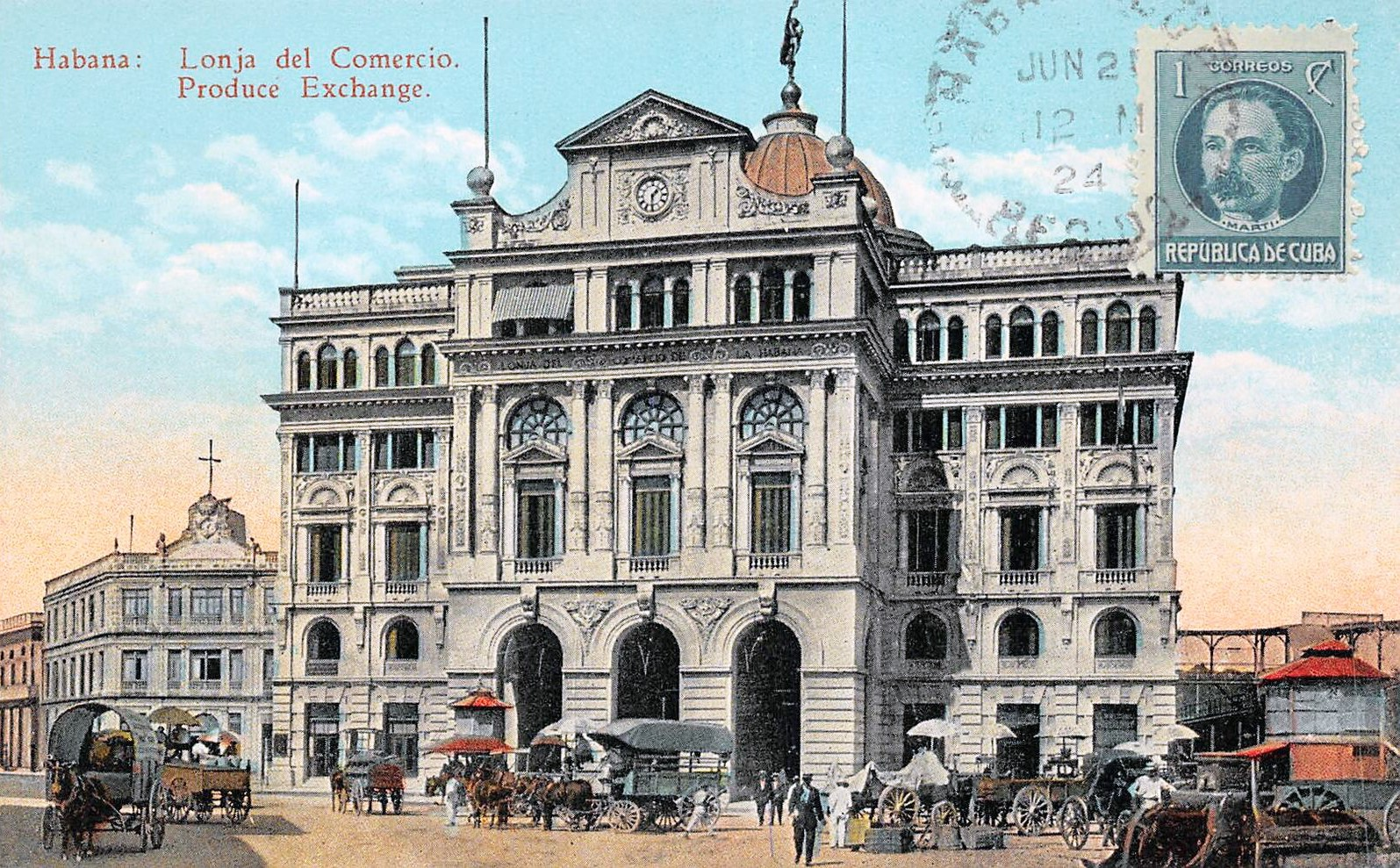
Image from 1916

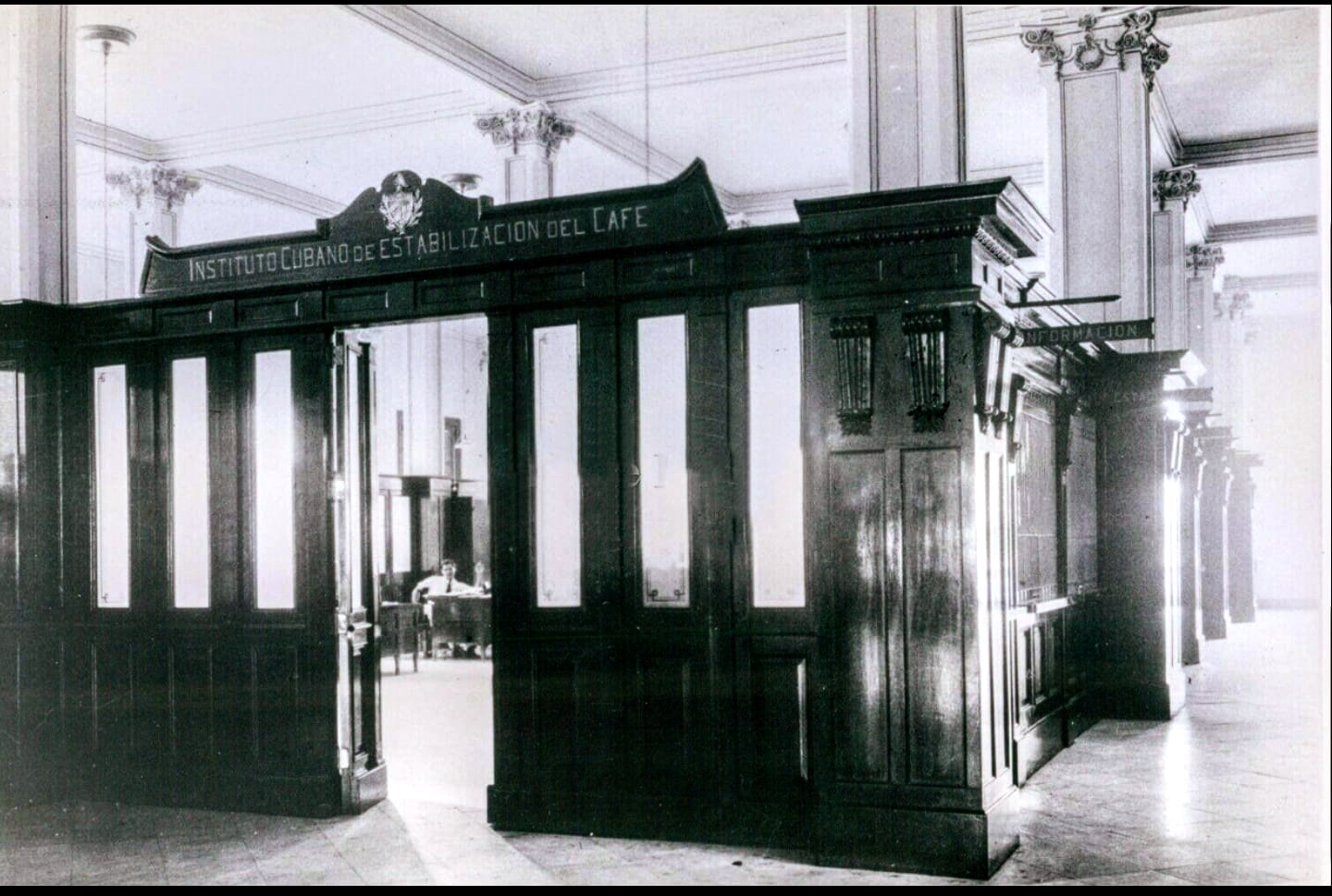
El Instituto Cubano de la Estabilización del Café, LA LONJA DEL COMERCIO

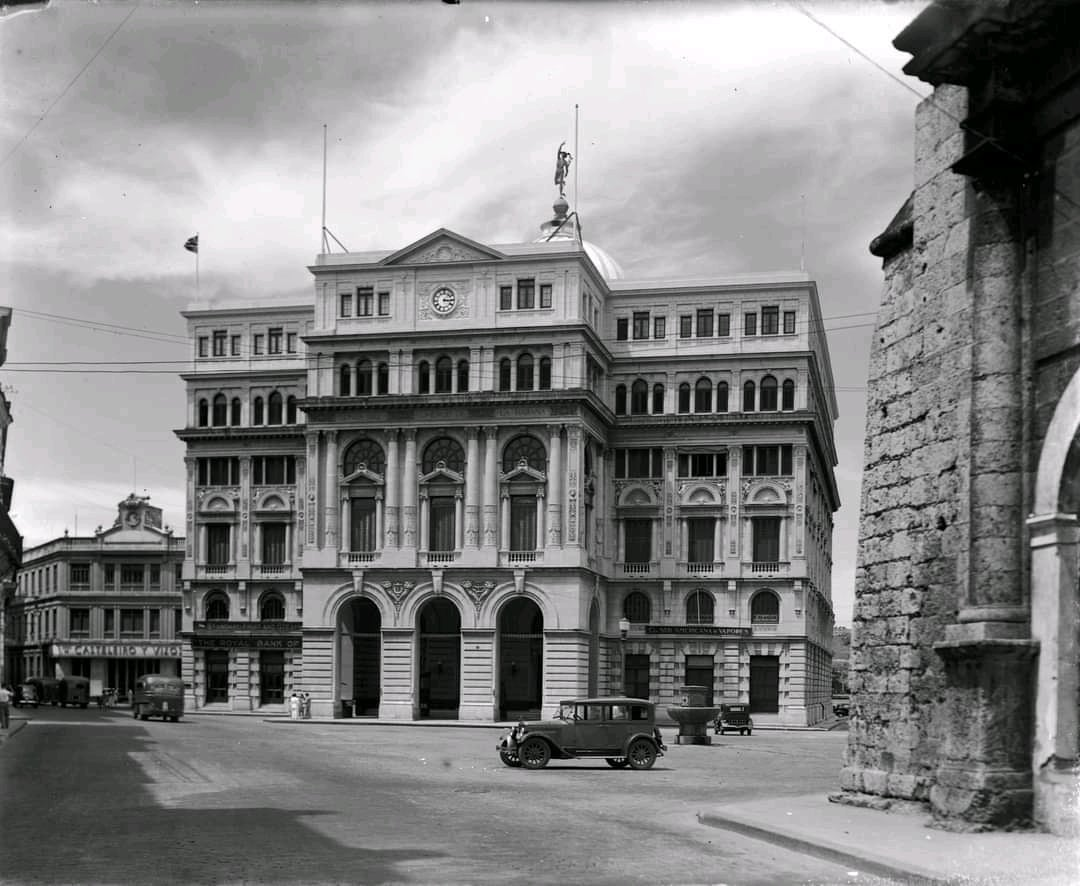
Lonja del Comercio building

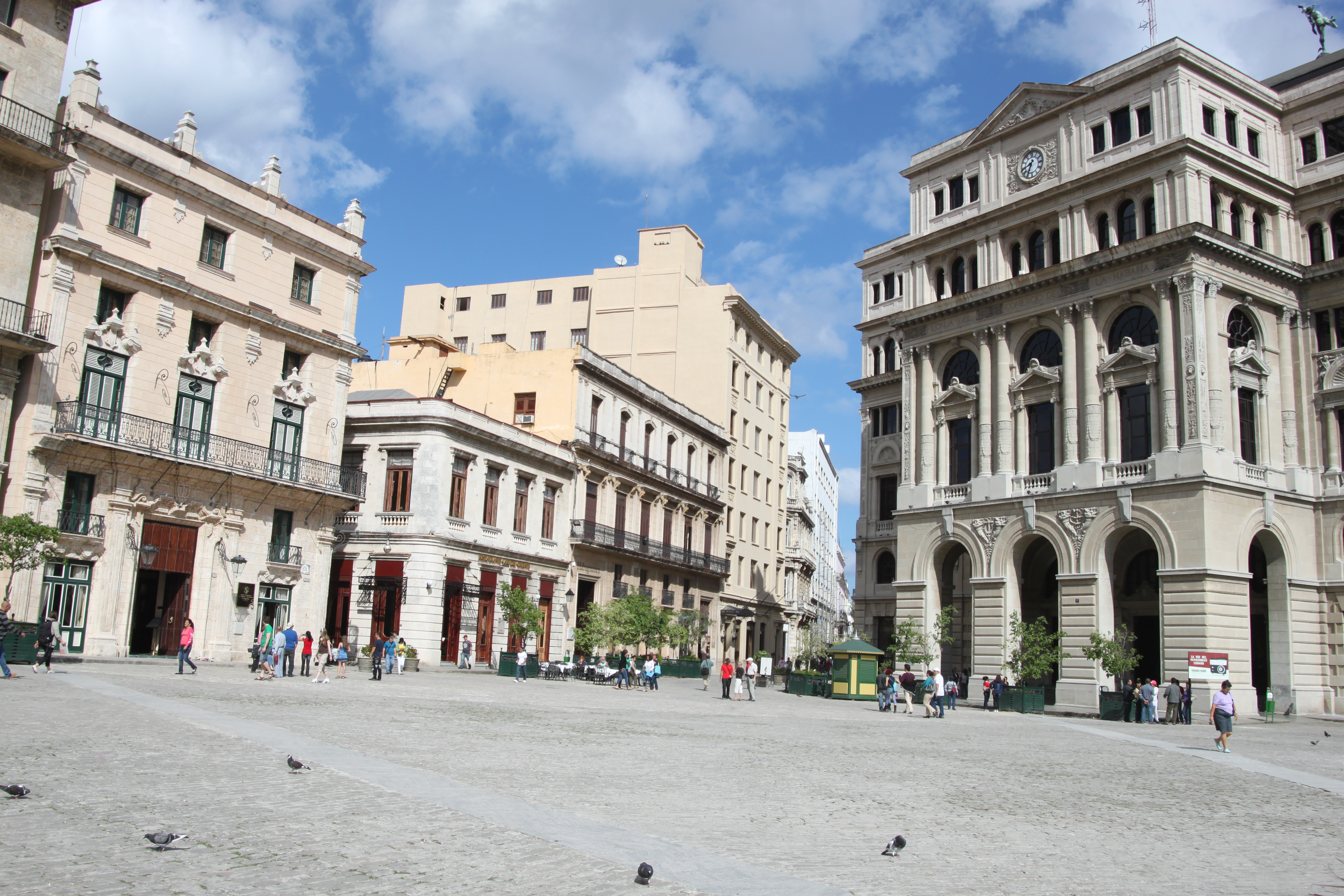

== See also ==
- List of buildings in Havana
- El Templete
- Purdy and Henderson, Engineers
- Gran Teatro de La Habana
- Radiocentro CMQ Building
- Palacio de los Capitanes Generales

== Bibliography ==
- La Habana: guía de arquitectura
