= Jacobine Jones =

Canadian artist (1897–1976)

- Born: Phyllis Jacobine Jones; 1897; London, England
- Died: 1976
- Education: Regent Street Polytechnic in London
- Known for: sculptor

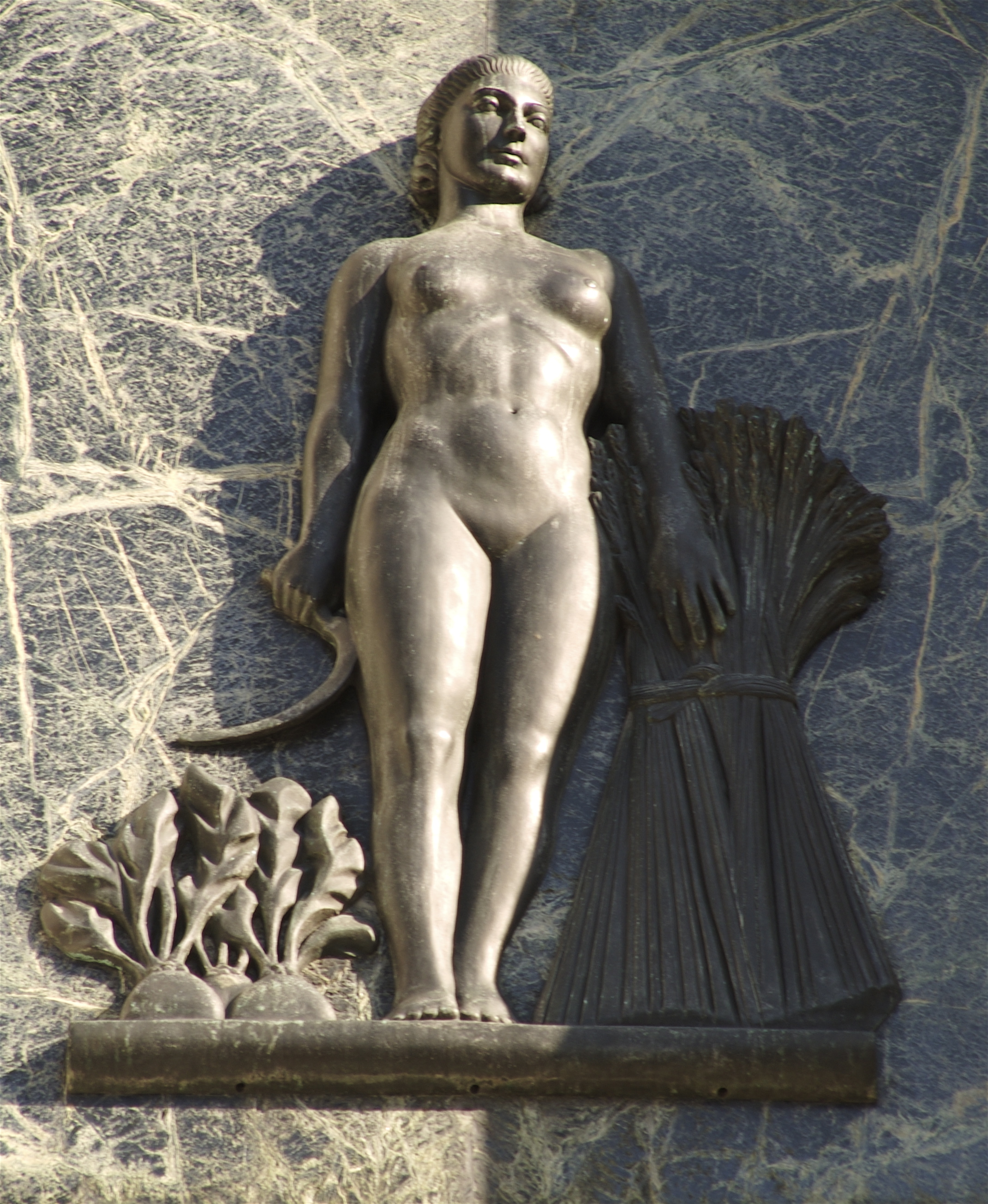
Bank of Canada building relief.

Phyllis Jacobine Jones RCA (1897–1976) was an English-born Canadian sculptor. She was born in England, but emigrated to Canada in 1932.

== Career ==
Jones traveled around Denmark, Italy and France with her mother for years until, at 28, she studied casting, carving, and modeling at the Regent Street Polytechnic in London with Harold Brownsword and there she won a gold medal for her animal modelling. She then studied in Italy, Denmark, and France where she exhibited at the Salon. Her figure of an equestrian St. Joan (1930) carved in Rouen stone was exhibited at the Royal Academy of Arts, London, and later exhibited at the Royal Glasgow Institute of Fine Arts, and purchased by that city for the Kelvingrove Art Gallery and Museum. She moved to Canada in 1932, settled in York Mills, Toronto, and joined the Sculptors' Society of Canada in 1939. She also joined the Ontario Society of Artists (1951-1956). From 1951 to 1956 she was the head of the department of sculpture at the Ontario College of Art.

In 1969, she had a solo show of her work at Rodman Hall, St. Catharines, Ontario. She lived at Niagara-on-the-Lake. She is represented in the National Gallery of Canada (RCA Diploma Coll.); Art Gallery of Hamilton; University of Guelph Art Collection and other galleries and private collections. In 1954, she was made a full member of the Royal Canadian Academy of Arts.

There is a biography published called: Put On Her Mettle: The Life and Art of Jacobine Jones by Natalie Luckyj (1945–2002). Jones' birthdate is sometimes listed as 1898, which is incorrect, and in some places her mother's last name, "Nielsen," is misspelt as "Neilsen." The fonds for the artist is available at Queen's University at Kingston Library archives.

== Work ==
Jones' work includes:

- architectural sculpture for the Gore Vale Insurance building, Galt, Ontario (now Cambridge, Ontario), 1934
- a sculpted family scene in prehistoric times, bearing the Latin legend "Sic Vita Vitalis" or "Thus Is Life Livable", above the main entrance to the Rogers Campus (once Confederation Life Headquarters) in Toronto.
- on the 1937 Bank of Canada Building in Ottawa, Ontario, seven figures representing Canada's seven principal industries at the time: fishing, electricity, mining, agriculture, forestry, manufacturing, and construction
- figures of Scholar and Hockey Player on Kerr Hall, Toronto Metropolitan University, Toronto
- six animal-themed bas-reliefs, including Walrus and Skunk, for the 1948 Bank of Montreal building at King & Bay Street in Toronto, plus two reliefs depicting British Columbia and Alberta. These were removed to the Guild Park and Gardens sculpture garden in 1972
- sculptures of John Graves Simcoe, Isaac Brock, Samuel de Champlain, and James Wolfe on the Sigmund Samuel Canadiana Building now part of the University of Toronto, 1950
