= Royal Bank Tower (Vancouver) =

Royal Bank Tower (Six Seventy Five)
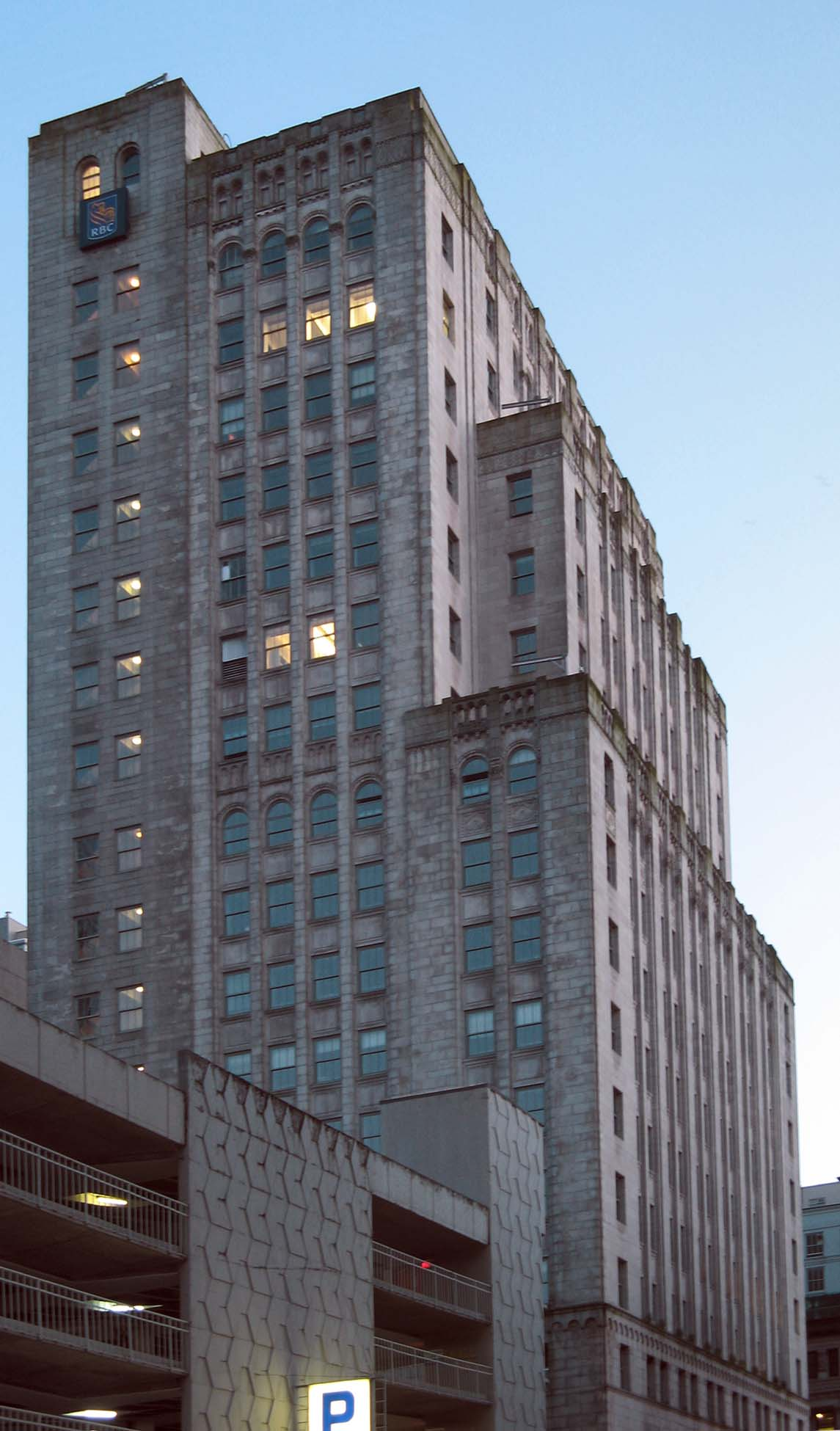
- Interactive map of the Royal Bank Tower (Six Seventy Five) area

General information
- Type: Commercial offices
- Location: 675 West Hastings Street; Vancouver, British Columbia
- Coordinates: 49.285250°N 123.113359°W
- Construction started: 1929
- Completed: 1931
- Cost: CAD$1.75 million (1930)

Height
- Roof: 84.74 m (278.0 ft)

Technical details
- Floor count: 16
- Lifts/elevators: 4

Design and construction
- Architect: Sumner Godfrey Davenport
- Structural engineer: Purdy and Henderson

Royal Bank Tower (Vancouver) is a 16-storey office tower located in downtown Vancouver and served as the regional office for the Royal Bank of Canada until 1973.

Designed by the bank's chief architect Sumner Godfrey Davenport, construction began in 1929 and completed in 1931. It was one of two notable projects designed by Davenport.

The mix of Art Deco and Neo-Romanesque office building is now undergoing rezoning application and restoration.

== See also ==
- Royal Centre (1973) - home to Royal Bank and also referred to as Royal Bank Tower
