= List of banks in Cuba =

This is a list of banks in Cuba which have been issued banking licences by the Central Bank of Cuba.

== Commercial banks ==
Bank name	Year founded	No. branches (Domestic)	No. branches (International)
Banco de Crédito y Comercio	1997		
Banco de Inversiones	1996		
Banco Exterior de Cuba	1999		
Banco Financiero Internacional	1984		
Banco Industrial de Venezuela-Cuba	2005		
Banco Internacional de Comercio	1993		
Banco Metropolitano	1996		
Banco Nacional de Cuba	1948		
Banco Popular de Ahorro	1983		

== Foreign banks ==
Bank name	Country of domicile	No. branches in Cuba	Other Operations
Banco Bilbao Vizcaya Argentaria	Spain		
Banco Sabadell	Spain		
Bankia	Spain		
BPCE International et Outre-Mer	France		
Fransabank	Lebanon		
Havin Bank Ltd.	United Kingdom		
National Bank of Canada	Canada	0	Representative office in Cuba since 1995 and in Cuba since 1928
Republic Bank	Trinidad and Tobago		
Scotiabank	Canada	0 (24 in 1960 none since)	Representative offices in Havana; formerly operated branches 1899-1960

Havin Bank was founded as Havana International Bank Ltd. (HIB) in 1973 with Banco Central de Cuba as a shareholder.
