= Olga María Rodríguez Fariñas =

Cuban revolutionary

Olga Morgan Goodwin
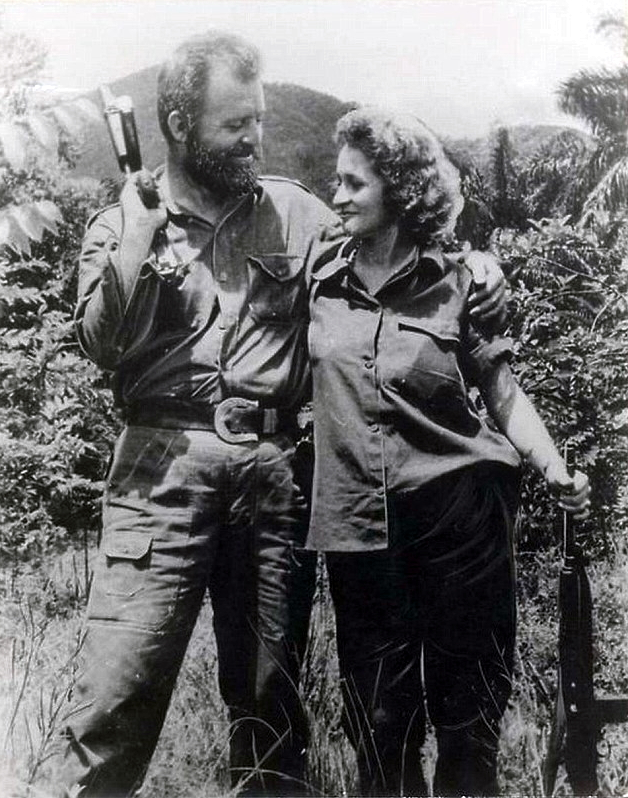
- Olga María Rodríguez Fariñas with her first husband, William Alexander Morgan, c. 1958
- Born: April 22, 1936; Escambray Mountains, Cuba
- Died: April 16, 2024 (aged 87); Florida, United States
- Spouses: William Alexander Morgan (m. 1958; died 1961) Jim Goodwin (m. 1985; died 2023)
- Children: 2

Olga Morgan Goodwin (April 22, 1936 – April 16, 2024), born Olga María Rodríguez Fariñas, was a Cuban revolutionary who fought in the Cuban Revolution. She married American-born Cuban guerrilla commander William Alexander Morgan, who was a prominent leader in the Second National Front of the Escambray.

After the Cuban Revolution, she and her husband were persecuted by the Castro government. Both were convicted by a military tribunal in 1961, with Morgan executed and Rodríguez sentenced to 30 years in prison. Due to international pressure, Rodríguez was released in 1971, after only 10 years of imprisonment.

Rodríguez fled to the United States in 1980 during the Mariel boatlift. After remarrying in 1985, she went by Olga Morgan Goodwin.

== Early life ==
Rodríguez was born on April 22, 1936, in central Cuba. She grew up in a poor family in the Escambray Mountains. Rodríguez was the second eldest of six siblings.

Rodríguez was president of her senior class at Santa Clara teacher's college. She was the first woman to be elected to the position.

== Cuban Revolution ==
As a student, Rodríguez supported the Cuban resistance against Fulgencio Batista, organizing protests against Batista as a member of the political group "Directorio". She helped assemble a bomb to be used during riots in April 1958.

Her anti-government activities attracted the attention of the secret police, who showed her photograph to neighbors to try to find her. Unable to find Rodríguez, they instead beat her cousin Gilberto and left him on her parents' doorstep. On April 9, 1958, she fled to the mountains and joined the Escambray rebellion, becoming the first woman to join the Second Front. At a rebel training camp in Jibacoa, Rodríguez met American William Alexander Morgan, who had joined the rebels a month prior. Rodríguez worked in a medical camp in the town of Nuevo Mundo, where she regularly conversed with Morgan.

In October 1958, Morgan proposed to Rodríguez. On November 17, 1958, the pair married in a ceremony at a farmhouse in the mountains. They made a ring out of a leaf.

== Post-revolution Cuba ==
The Cuban Revolution concluded with the Triumph of the Revolution on January 1, 1959, in which Batista resigned and fled the country. Shortly afterwards, Rodríguez became pregnant with her first child. She gave birth to her daughter, Loretta, on August 28, 1959. Fidel Castro visited Morgan and Rodríguez at the clinic to congratulate the couple, bursting into the room and declaring himself the child's godfather, but Rodríguez informed him that Eloy Gutiérrez Menoyo was actually the child's godfather. On July 31, 1960, Rodríguez gave birth to her second daughter, Olguita.

By the summer of 1960, Morgan and Rodríguez had become frog farmers, running a bullfrog nursery on the Ariguanabo River. The nursery employed hundreds of Cuban workers. The farm harvested frog legs and skin, which were sold to buyers in the United States.

The Morgans' house was shot at several times, on one occasion killing their pet dog. Their house was always guarded by multiple bodyguards, many of whom lived with the Morgans. The Morgans later learned that some of the guards had been spies for the Castro government.

In fall 1960, concerned about Castro's rule, Morgan and Rodríguez helped smuggle weapons into the mountains. Due to Morgan's fame within Cuba, Rodríguez smuggled the weapons in his place. On October 16, 1960, Castro ordered Morgan's arrest for counter-revolutionary activities. On October 19, Morgan was summoned to a meeting for the National Institute for Agrarian Reform, at which he was arrested. Morgan was formally charged with plotting to join and lead the counter-revolutionaries who were active in the Escambray Mountains. Rodríguez was placed under house arrest.

On December 31, 1960, Rodríguez was able to visit Morgan in prison for the first time since their arrests. Morgan suggested fleeing to Toledo with their daughters, where his mother would aid her. That night, Rodríguez gave hot chocolate to the men guarding her that contained crushed sleeping pills. After the guards had all fallen asleep, she grabbed her daughters and fled. On January 4, 1961, she entered the Brazilian Embassy and requested asylum.

On March 9, 1961, twelve defendants were tried in a military tribunal, including Morgan, who received a death sentence. Rodríguez was tried in absentia and received a 30-year sentence for high treason.

Rodríguez, hearing about a plot to break Morgan out of prison before his execution, left the embassy to join them, leaving her children with her parents. However, the plot was foiled by the Castro government, with most of the conspirators arrested or killed. Morgan was executed by firing squad on March 11, 1961. On March 12, 1961, Rodríguez was arrested while in transit between safe houses in Santa Clara and Camagüey. Rodríguez only learned of Morgan's execution after her arrest.

== Incarceration ==
After her arrest, Rodríguez was first taken to La Cabaña to see the site of her husband's execution. On March 18, 1961, she was taken to a Guanabacoa prison. Rodríguez was later imprisoned in Guanajay.

In prison, Rodríguez was the leader of Las Plantadas ("the planted ones"), a group of prisoners who refused to follow the new government, such as by refusing to take classes on Marxism-Leninism. Las Plantadas waged eleven hunger strikes throughout their imprisonment. At one point, Rodríguez was placed in solitary confinement for three months. During one 18-month period, she was denied visitations from her family. Rodríguez made several attempts to escape the various prisons in which she was held, but was caught each time; on one occasion, her escape attempt caused her sentence to be increased by five years.

Rodríguez was frequently beaten with truncheons by the guards, including by the director of the prison system, Manolo Martinez. One of the beatings permanently damaged her right eye. The beatings also damaged her veins — later in her life, Rodríguez suffered migraines, which her doctor attributed to collapsed veins.

In the United States, William Morgan's mother Loretta campaigned for Rodríguez to be released from prison. In 1971, the United Nations Commission on Human Rights began an investigation into conditions in Cuban prisons. In response to the international pressure from the United Nations investigation, Castro freed ten political prisoners — including Rodríguez, who had only served 10 years of her 30-year sentence. Rodríguez was released on August 2, 1971.

== Post-release in Cuba ==
After her release from prison, Rodríguez moved in with her parents and daughters in Santa Clara, as her home had been confiscated by the Cuban government. Rodríguez's relationship with her daughters was strained, with her daughters calling her a "traitor to Cuba."

Struggling to find a job as a political enemy of the Castro government, Rodríguez found employment at a convent hospital in Havana. At the hospital, she cleaned and kept medical records. She also sold knitted items on the street.

Rodríguez wanted to move to the United States, where Morgan's family lived, but was repeatedly denied a visa to leave Cuba. In September 1978, Castro announced that current and former prisoners of Cuba could leave the country and take their families with them, after obtaining the necessary documents. After saving up enough money, on October 27, 1979, Rodríguez and her family planned to fly to the United States. However, Rodríguez was prevented from leaving the country, so her family left for the United States without her.

In 1980, one of the nuns at her convent told Rodríguez about a group of Cubans storming the Peruvian embassy to request asylum, and encouraged Rodríguez to join them. Rodríguez scaled the embassy's fence, and spent several weeks on the embassy grounds.

Rodríguez left the embassy to join other Cuban emigrants on the Mariel boatlift. In July 1980, Rodríguez attempted to board a boat while hiding her identity by claiming to be a prostitute, but was recognized by authorities and prohibited from leaving. Rodríguez camped at the harbor for a month, trying to get permission to leave the country. On August 17, she was finally permitted to leave, and boarded a boat to Florida. However, the Cuban Navy fired at the departing boats, damaging the hull of the boat Rodríguez was on. After traveling over 27 hours to reach Key West, the boat was close to capsizing and the engine failed. The U.S. Coast Guard ultimately towed the sinking boat to shore.

== United States ==
Rodríguez moved to Toledo, Ohio, to be with Morgan's family. Her parents moved to Ohio in 1981. In Toledo, she worked as a social worker at the Guadalupe Family Health Clinic.

In 1984, she met Jim Goodwin, a welder. The pair married in 1985. She took on the name Olga Morgan Goodwin.

Goodwin advocated for Morgan's remains to be relocated to the United States, a campaign that had been started by his mother Loretta shortly after his execution. In 2002, Ohio congresswoman Marcy Kaptur and New York congressman Charles Rangel traveled to Cuba to convince Cuban leader Fidel Castro to release Morgan's remains, but Cuban officials claimed they could not be located. In 2008, she hired an attorney to help in the effort to recover his remains. In 2015, she wrote a letter to Pope Francis—who had been helping mediate discussions during the Cuban thaw—to help return Morgan's remains to the United States. After Goodwin's death in 2024, her daughter Loretta pledged to continue her mother's mission to bring Morgan's remains back to the United States.

Morgan's United States citizenship was stripped in September 1959 for serving in a foreign nation's armed forces, due to his participation in the Cuban revolutionary forces. In the United States, Goodwin continuously advocated for Morgan's U.S. citizenship to be posthumously restored. In 2002, she began a letter writing campaign to restore his citizenship. In 2005, Goodwin—who was almost 70—threatened to go on a hunger strike in front of the White House to have his citizenship restored. In April 2007, the U.S. State Department acknowledged that its original reasoning for revoking Morgan's citizenship was invalid, and that "Mr. Morgan shall be deemed never to have relinquished his U.S. nationality."

In 2023, after her husband Jim Goodwin's death, she moved to Florida to live with her daughter Loretta.

== Death ==
On April 16, 2024, Goodwin suffered from a stroke at her home in Florida, and died at the age of 87.
