= Gashi =

Gashi may refer to:

- Gashi (tribe), a major historical tribe of northern Albania
- Gashi (surname), a surname associated with the tribe
- Gashi (rapper), an American rapper
- Gashi (singer), a Swedish singer

== See also ==
- Gashi, Iran (disambiguation), places in Iran
- Mado Gashi, a small town in Kenya
- Gaši, a Serbo-Croatian version of Gashi
- Innocent Thing (Korean: 가시, romanized: Gasi), a South Korean film
