= Albanian comics =

Comics traditions in Albania

Albanian comics, though not well known internationally, were produced mainly by comic authors from Kosovo. Until recently there was no comic tradition in Albania where comics were seen as junk literature known as fumeti (literally, little clouds of smoke) supposedly because pop art was prohibited by the dictatorial communist regime. Today there is one comic magazine published in Kosovo called Leon, and there is Tafë Kusuri comic strip (oldest serial character founded by Agim Qena, and continued by his son Rron Qena) together with Garfield and Calvin and Hobbes (translated in Albanian) published by the newspaper Koha Ditore.

== Brief history ==
In Kosovo comic culture was influenced most notably by the subculture in Yugoslavia, although other countries had influence. The first comic strip published in Kosovo was Tafë Kusuri by Agim Qena (Rilindja newspaper). There was also an Albanian comic magazine published in Pristina, Kosovo during the nineties parallel governance, and it was called Strip Arti. It featured comics created by local and international authors. The magazine was discontinued for the lack of funding. Without Strip Arti, the comic culture had continued mainly through children and teenager magazines. A magazine dedicated to alternative arts called Hapi Alternativ, edited by comics fan Petrit Selimi, published local and foreign comics as well, introducing novel characters such as Hellboy to the Albanian language market.

Between 1997 and 1998, the Soros Foundation organised a year-long comic school, which was discontinued because of the Kosovo war.

Another mixed content magazine was Hareja (published monthly during the nineties by Ibrahim Kadriu) and a weekly children's supplement in Koha Ditore called Vizatori (published 2000–2005 by Yll Rugova). The Rrota printing house published and translated Spider-Man, Alan Ford and X-Men during 2003. Later they published a monthly children's magazine called Pishpiriku where a five-page comic (written and illustrated by Trembelat) was regularly featured. Daily Zëri in 1999 also published original works, and weekly Java in 2003 published Rrotelat (by Edon Muhaxheri), though both have discontinued the practice. In the 2020s Albanian-canadian manga author Arbër Rexhepi published Super Shqipez inspired by Albanian history, culture and mythology in Hal-Con, Halifax, Canada.

In colloquial Albanian comics are called "stripa" (strips), showing the influence of Yugoslav comic culture.

Comics are difficult to find to buy in Kosovo. Some of them are found in distribution points of Rilindja newspapers, while fans can also find limited copies in coffee shops such as Strip Depot (founded by Petrit Selimi), as well as the Dit' e Nat' bookshop-cafe.

== Authors ==
Main comic authors in Kosovo: Agim Qena, Shpend Kada, Binjamen Haxha, Valdet Gashi, Gjon Marku, Gani Sunduri, Gani Jakupi Ramadan Zapluzha Fahri Axhanela, Arbër Rexhepi.
Main comic authors in Albania: Shpend Bengu. Main comic publishers in Kosovo; Rilindja, Rrota, Hareja, Hapi Alternativ, Koha

== See also ==
- Albanian art
- Albanian music
