= Triumph of the Revolution =

1959 flight of Batista during the Cuban Revolution

- Part of the Cuban Revolution
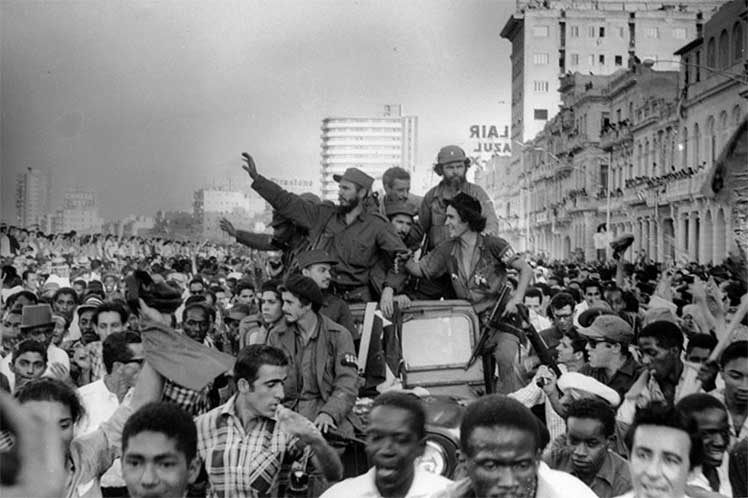
- Entrance of Fidel Castro and Huber Matos into Havana. (January 8, 1959).
Date	January 1, 1959
Location	Cuba
Result	Batista flees Cuba; Revolutionary Directorate captures Havana; Fidel Castro enters Havana and establishes a provisional government.

Belligerents
Cuba	Revolutionaries: 26 July Movement; Revolutionary Directorate of March 13th; Second National Front of Escambray

The Triumph of the Revolution is the historical term for the flight of Fulgencio Batista on January 1, 1959, and the capture of Havana by the 26 July Movement on January 8.

The flight of Batista from Cuba is marked by an official holiday on January 1.

== Events ==
=== Battle of Santa Clara and Cantillo coup plot ===
The Battle of Santa Clara consisted of a series of events in late December 1958 that led to the capture of the Cuban city of Santa Clara by revolutionaries under the command of Che Guevara at the end of the Cuban Revolution.

Throughout December of 1958, top military commanders began plotting the removal of Fulgencio Batista. On December 24, General Eulogio Cantillo secretly met with Fidel Castro and agreed to arrest Batista. Cantillo also agreed that his new government would merge with the 26th of July Movement to create a new united government.

=== Flight of Batista ===
On December 30, 1958, Cantillo notified Castro that coup plans had changed. Cantillo privately advised Batista that he should flee the country. Around midnight on January 1, 1959, Batista, realizing that his presidency could not continue, informed his cabinet and top officials at Camp Columbia, the Havana headquarters of the Cuban Constitutional Army, that he was resigning and would leave the country. At about 3:00 a.m., Batista boarded a plane in the Camp Columbia airfield with 40 of his supporters and immediate family members and flew to Ciudad Trujillo in the Dominican Republic. A second plane flew out of Havana later in the night, carrying ministers, officers, and the Governor of Havana, and a third plane followed. Batista took along a personal fortune of more than $300 million that he had amassed through bribery and corruption. Critics accused Batista and his supporters of taking as much as $700 million in fine art and cash with them as they fled into exile.

=== Riot and occupations in Havana ===
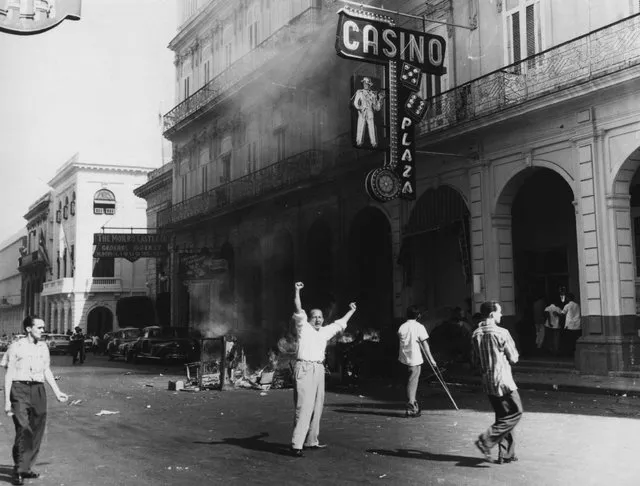
Rioters burn card tables and roulette wheels at Plaza Hotel Casino (January 1, 1959).

Immediately after the flight of Batista, members of the Revolutionary Directorate of 13 March Movement occupied the University of Havana, and the Presidential Palace. The action was done under the pretext of anxiety. When Fidel Castro announced his victory, and the establishment of a provisional government, no mention was made of the involvement of other rebel groups in such a government.

Besides the rebel occupation, Cuban citizens began to loot and vandalize Havana. Angry mobs attacked several casinos, and destroyed slot machines. Sporadic gun fights killed thirteen people. The casino at Sans Souci was set ablaze by arsonists. Alongside the chaos, many citizens filled the streets in celebration of the flight of Batista, often shouting the slogan "Abajo Batista, Viva Fidel" ("Down with Batista, Long live Fidel").

=== Freedom Caravan to Havana ===
On January 2, Castro called for a general strike, and began his trek to Havana in his self-stylized "Freedom Caravan". The rebel army columns led by Che Guevara, and Camilo Cienfuegos reached Havana by January 2. The next day, Guevara secured La Cabaña fortress in Havana. The arrival of the 26th of July Movement restored order in Havana, ending the rioting.

On January 7, Cuban television broadcast the execution of the commander of the Santa Clara army barracks. The televised execution was ordered by Che Guevara, who was the rebel commander of Santa Clara at the time.

Castro entered Havana to the sight of cheering crowds on January 8. After arriving in Havana, Castro ordered the Revolutionary Directorate to stand down, causing them to abandon their occupied positions. This capitulation was likely because of the armed superiority of the 26th of July Movement.

On the night of January 8, Castro delivered a speech at the Camp Columbia military base in Havana. In the speech Castro denounced other rebel groups who were hoarding weapons, an allusion to the weapon stocks of the Revolutionary Directorate. Fidel Castro elaborated that weapons hoarding was pointless considering the shift to democracy, specifically stating:

When all the citizen's rights have been restored, when elections are to be called as soon as possible - arms for what? Hiding arms to what end? To blackmail the President of the Republic? To threaten the peace? To set up gangster organizations? Are we to go back to daily shoot-outs in the streets of Havana? Arms for what?

==== Photo gallery ====
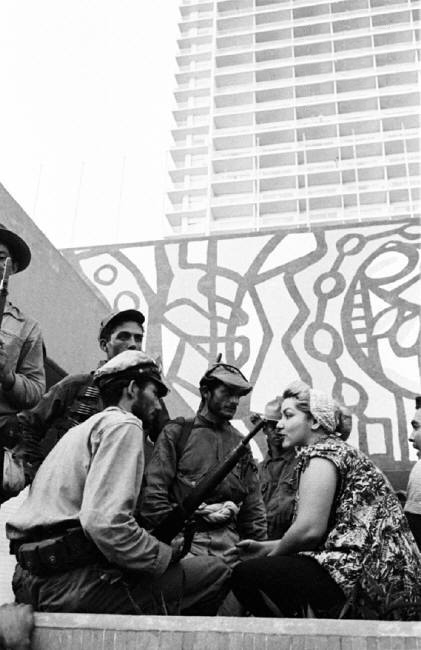
Rebel soldiers at the Havana Hilton, January 1, 1959.

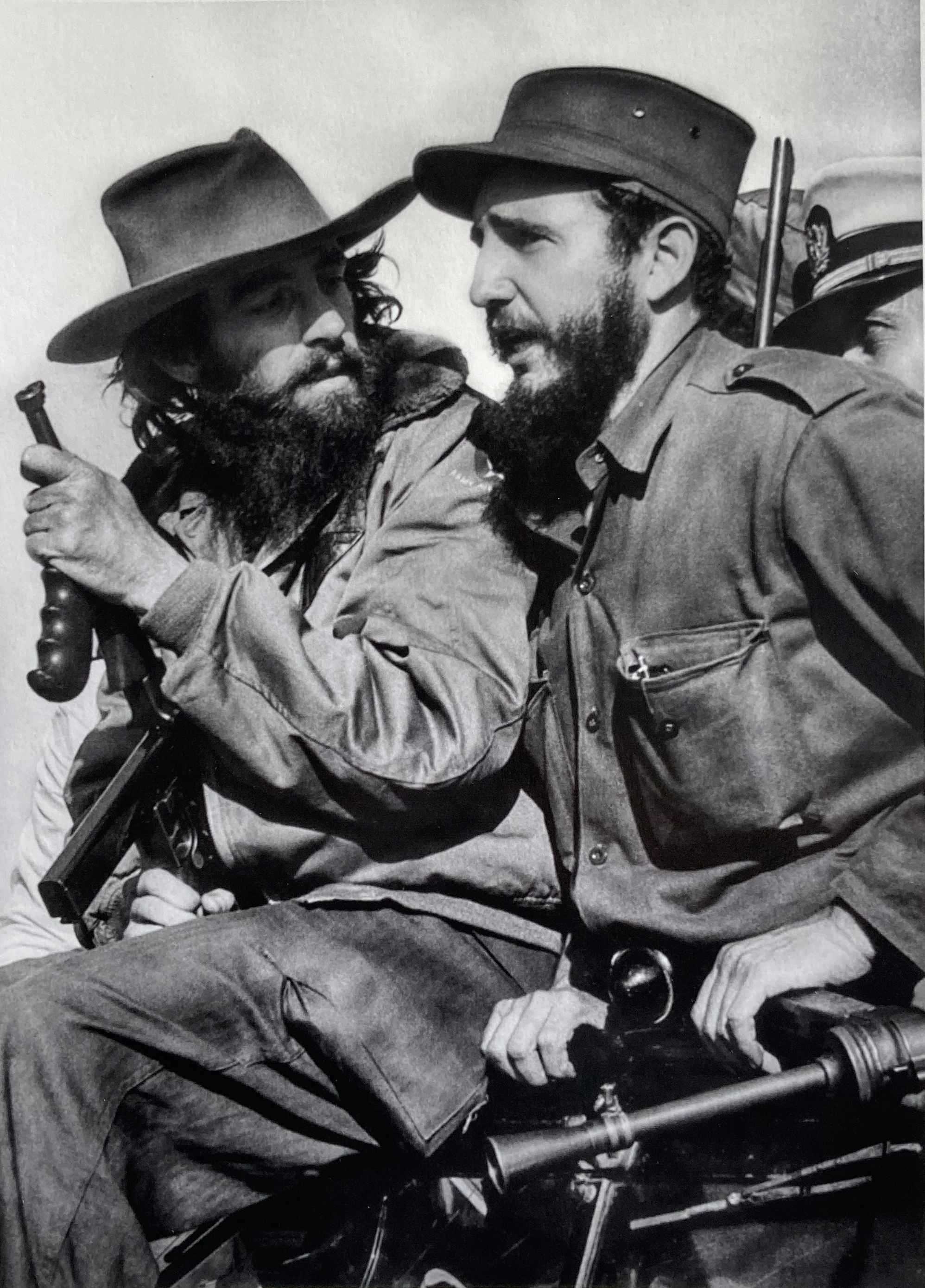
Fidel Castro and Camilo Cienfuegos entering Havana, 8 January 1959

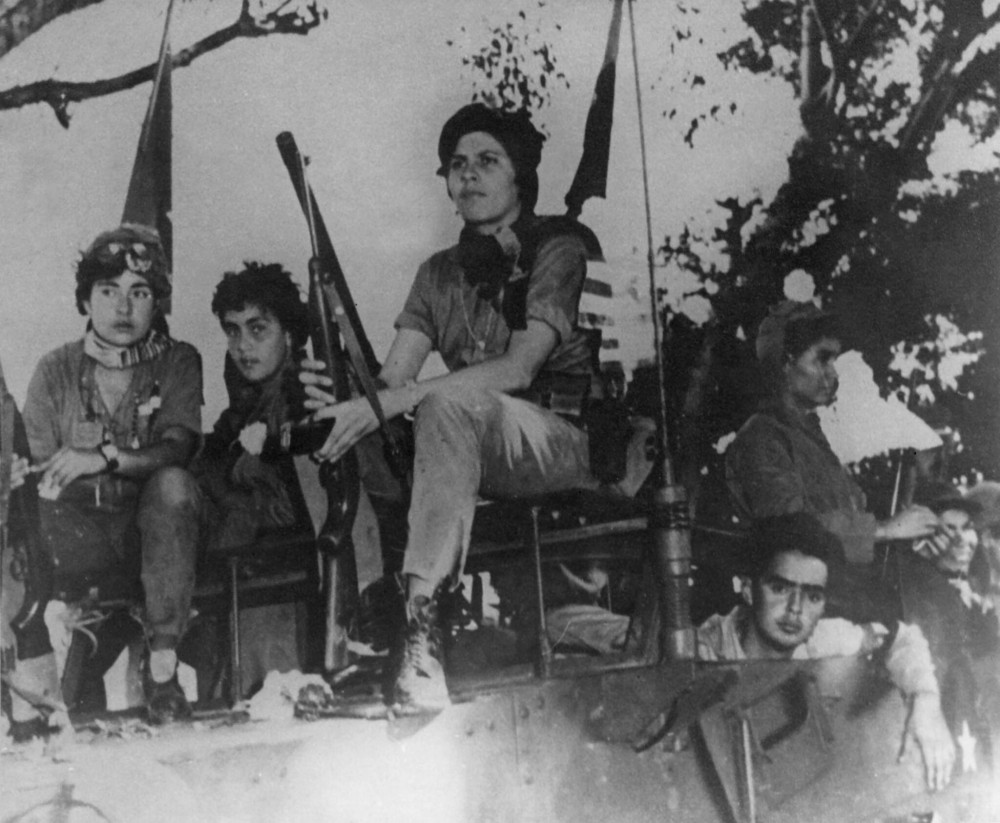
Mariana Grajales Platoon entering Havana on January 8, 1959

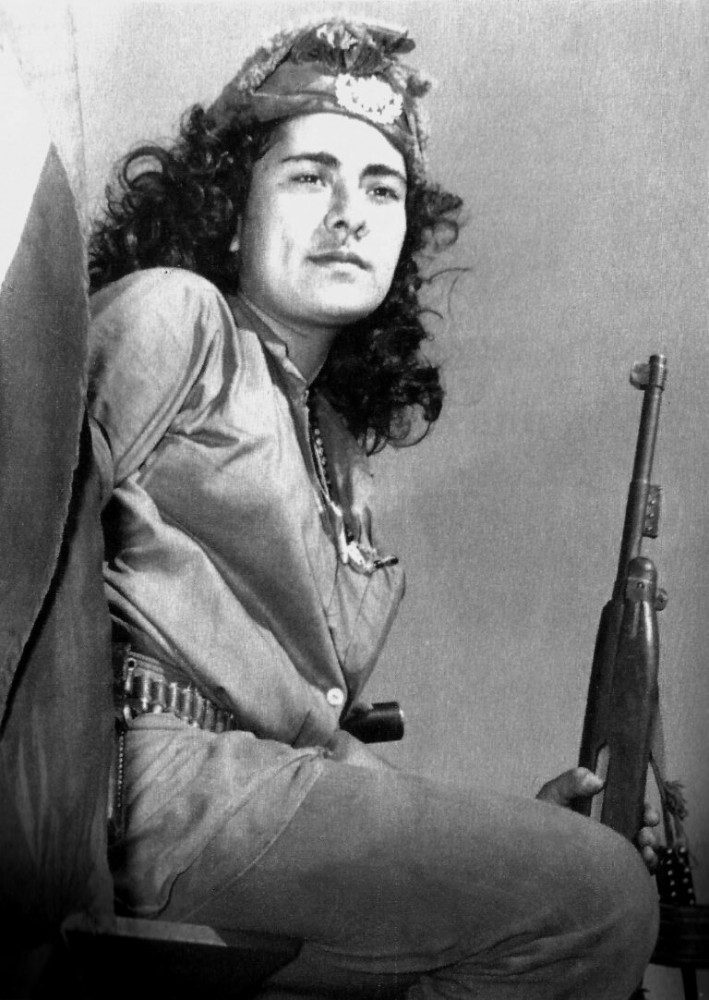
Commander Teté Puebla, entering Havana on January 8, 1959

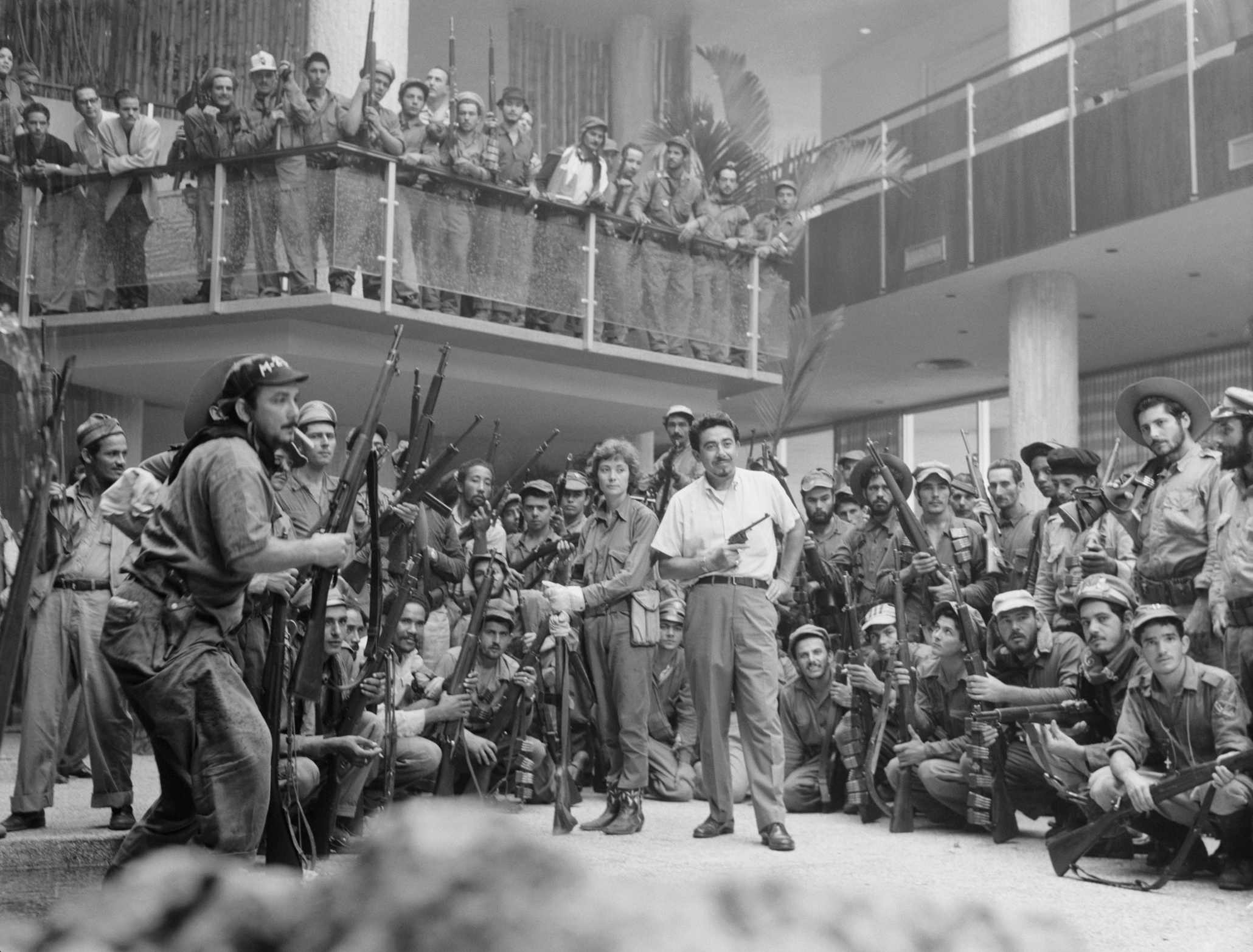
Rebel soldiers in the Havana Hilton, January 1959

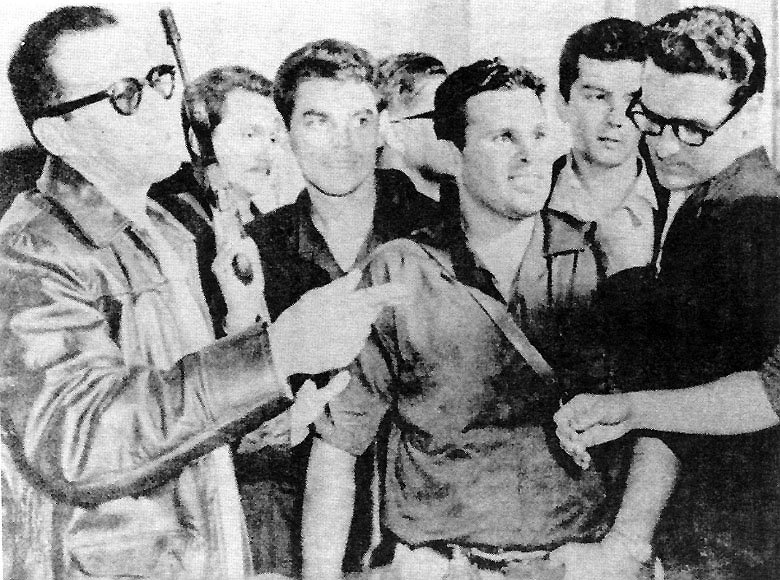
Meeting of Ramon Barquin, Aldo Vera Serafin, and Armando Hart Dávalos, at Camp Colombia military base. January, 1959.

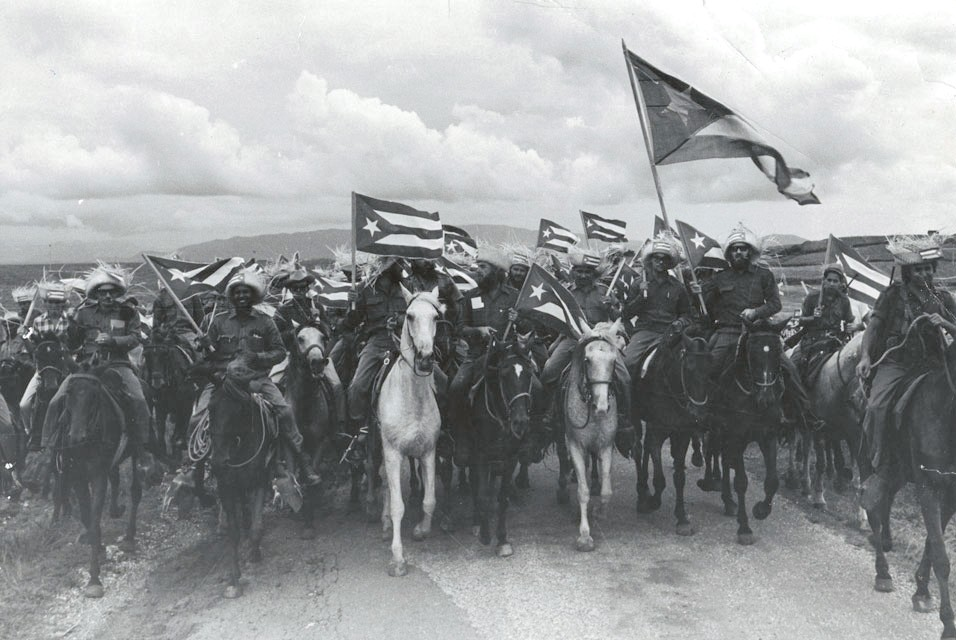
Staged photo of rebel cavalry. January 1959.

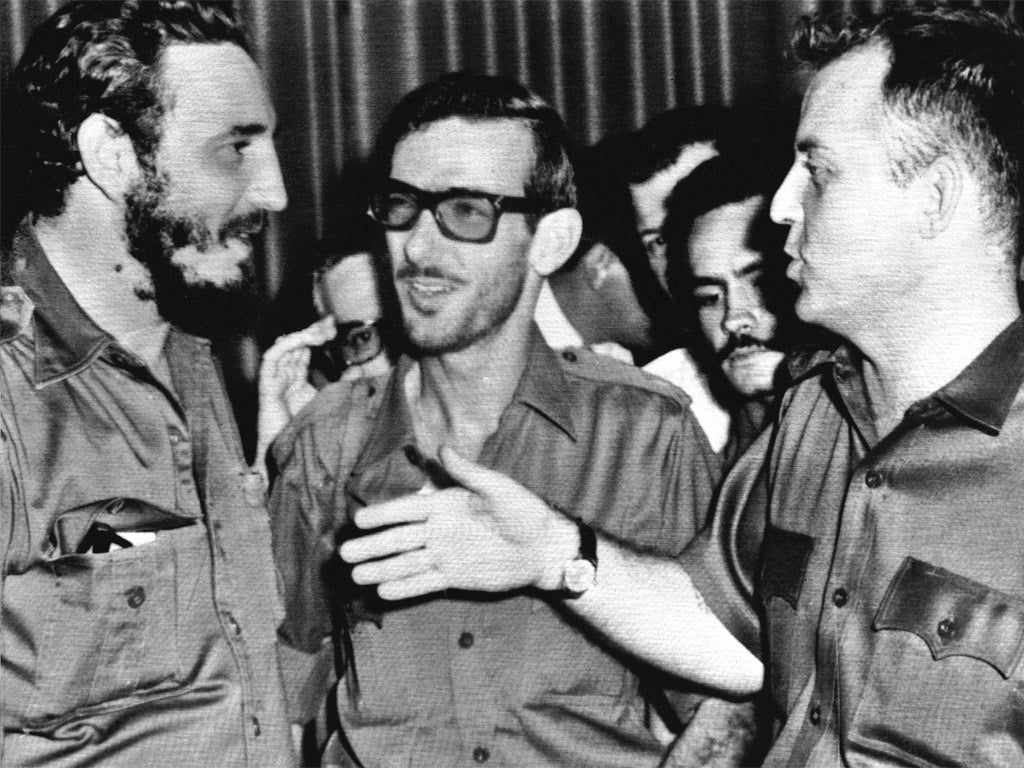
Meeting of Fidel Castro, Eloy Gutiérrez Menoyo, and William Alexander Morgan, after the rebel victory.

== Aftermath ==
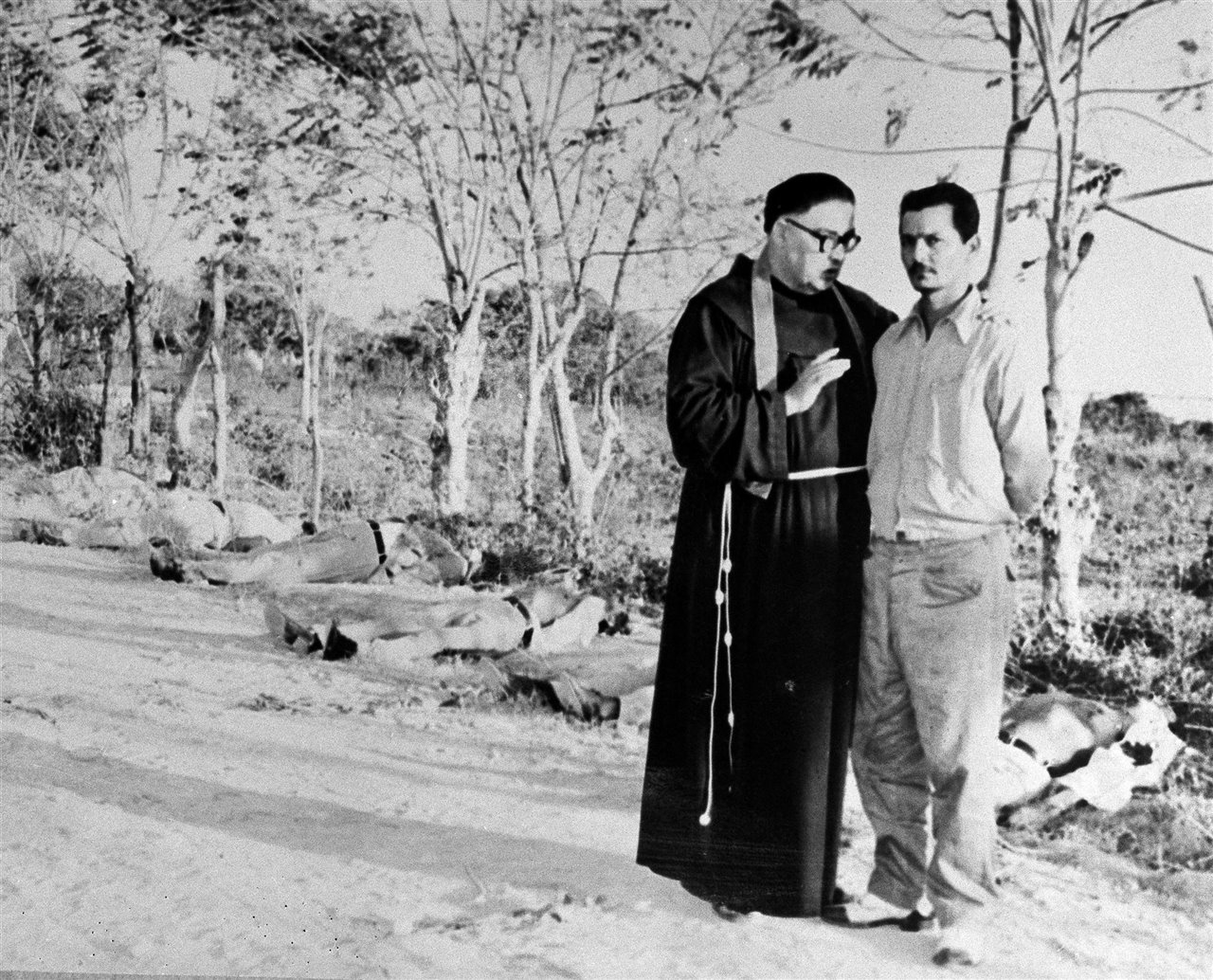
Arístidez Díaz receiving his last rites before being shot at San Juan Hill.

The first legal act passed by the new provisional government was the legalization of the death penalty. This act was passed on January 10, two days after Castro's entrance to Havana. In the immediate aftermath of the triumph of the revolution, tribunals were set up around Cuba to convict former Batistiano collaborators. On January 12, Raul Castro ended a trial of collaborators early, and ordered all of the accused to be executed. These men were shot and put in a mass grave at San Juan Hill.

Raúl Gómez Treto, senior legal advisor to the Cuban Ministry of Justice, argued that the death penalty was justified in order to prevent citizens themselves from taking justice into their own hands, as had happened twenty years earlier in the anti-Machado rebellion. Biographers of Fidel Castro often note that in January 1959 the Cuban public was in a "lynching mood", and point to a survey at the time showing 93% public approval for the tribunal process. Moreover, a 22 January 1959, Universal Newsreel broadcast in the United States and narrated by Ed Herlihy featured Fidel Castro asking an estimated one million Cubans whether they approved of the executions, and being met with a roaring "¡Si!" (yes).

== Holiday ==
Triumph of the Revolution
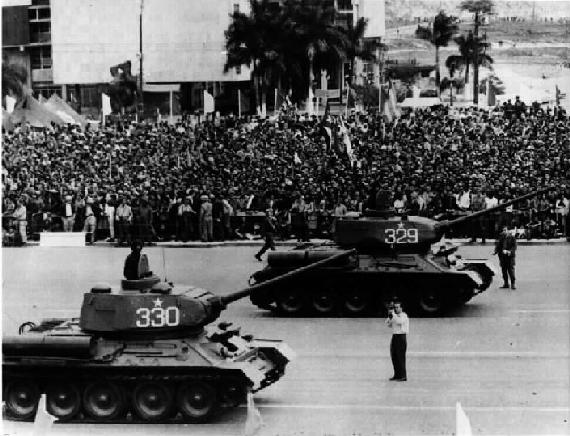
- The parade in 1961.
- Official name: Triunfo de la Revolución
- Observed by: Cuba
- Type: Historical
- Significance: Anniversary of 1958 revolution
- Date: January 1
- Next time: 1 January 2027

The holiday known as the "Triumph of the Revolution" (Spanish: Triunfo de la Revolución), also known as Liberation Day (Spanish: Día de la Liberación), is a celebration in Cuba of the anniversary of the victory of the revolution led by Fidel Castro in 1959 which established the present government in Cuba. The holiday is celebrated on January 1 every year.

The event is marked by military parades, fireworks and concerts throughout the country. The first parade of the Cuban Revolutionary Armed Forces on the holiday took place on the Plaza de la Revolución in 1960.

Several exiled Cuban communities such as in Miami where many Cuban Americans reside celebrate May 20 as their national holiday in which Cuba became independent from the United States as opposed to the January 1 holiday. U.S. President Donald Trump released a statement in 2017 celebrating Cuban independence on May 20, only to be met with resistance from the Cuban government labeling it "controversial" and "ridiculous".

== See also ==
- Public holidays in Cuba
- Cuban Revolution
