= Gashi (surname) =

Origin
- Language: Albanian

Gashi is a northern Albanian surname associated with the Gashi tribe. It is the second most common surname in Kosovo. Notable people with the surname include:

== People ==
=== Momonym ===
- Gashi (rapper), or Labinot "Larry" Gashi, an American rapper of Albanian descent, formerly known as The Kid Gashi
- Gashi (singer) or Gëzim Gashi (born 1990), a Swedish singer of Kosovan origin

=== Surname ===
- Afrim Gashi (born 1977), Macedonian politician
- Albin Gashi (born 1997), Austrian footballer
- Ardian Gashi (born 1981), Norwegian footballer
- Ardit Gashi (born 1998), Italian footballer
- Arsim Gashi (born 1983), Swedish footballer
- Dardan Gashi (born 1969), Kosovar politician
- Elvis Gashi (born 1992), Kosovar kickboxer
- Ervin Gashi (born 1990), Swiss footballer
- Fadil Gashi (born 1968), Kosovan politician and former Kosovo Liberation Army commander
- Fadil Gashi (Kosovo politician, born 1987)
- Henri Gashi (born 2001), English footballer
- Ibrahim Gashi, (born 1963), Kosovar scientist of policy and diplomacy
- Jonida Gashi, Albanian cultural theorist and senior researcher
- Krenar Gashi, Kosovar journalist
- Mirko Gashi (1939–1995), Yugoslav writer
- Ramadan Gashi (born 1958), Kosovar politician
- Senad Gashi (born 1990), German boxer and YouTuber
- Shaban Gashi (1939–1990), Yugoslav cinematographer and photographer
- Shkëlzen Gashi (born 1988), Swiss footballer
- Valdet Gashi (1986–2015), German terrorist, kickboxer and Muay Thai fighter
- Zef Gashi (born 1938), Montenegrin Roman Catholic prelate
- Zyrafete Gashi (1955–2013), Kosovar comedian
