= Gani Jakupi =

Comic book author from Kosovo

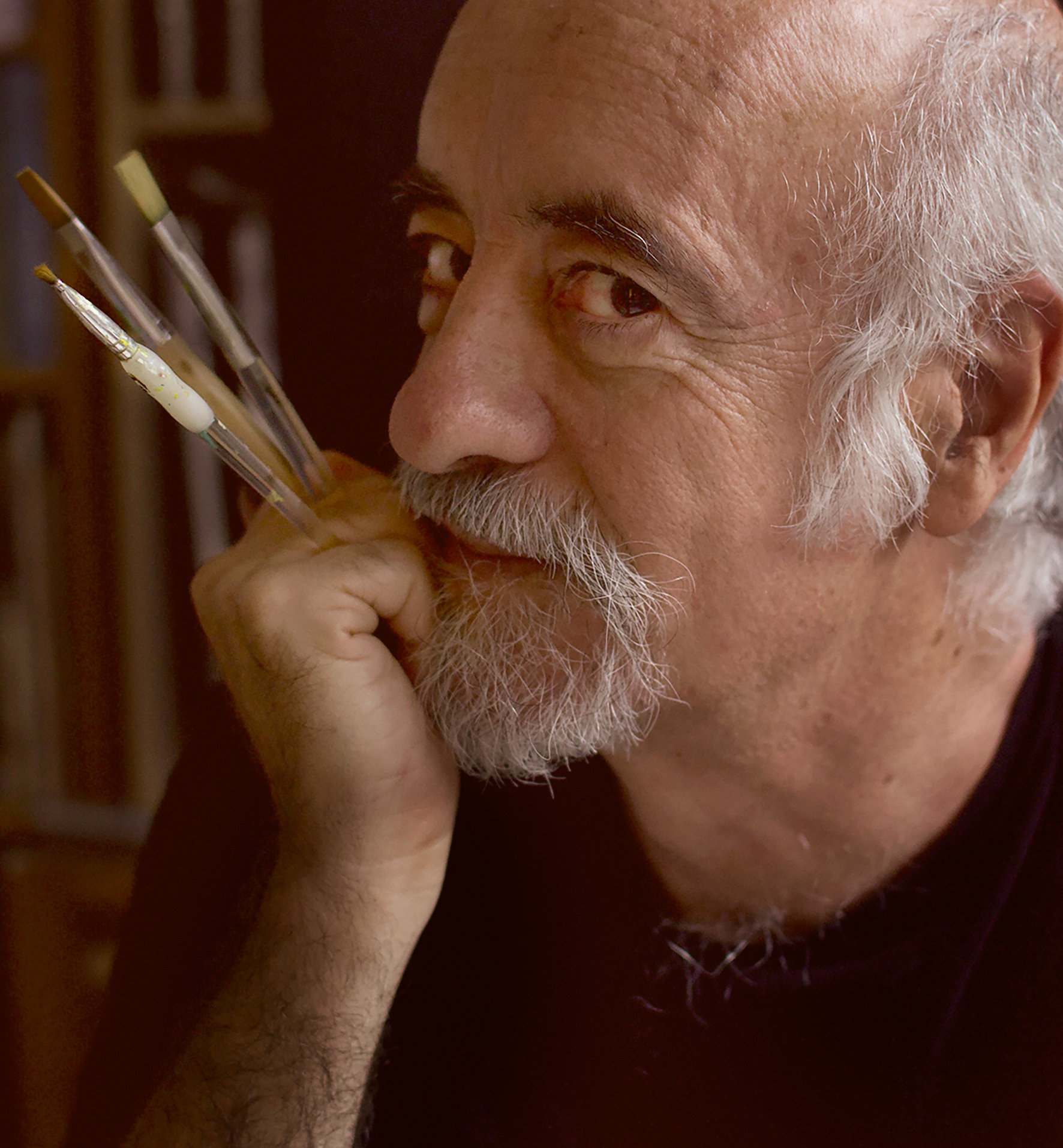
- Gani Jakupi in 2020
- Born: March 7, 1956 (age 70) Nishec, Kosovo
- Areas: Writer, Artist
- Notable works: El Comandante Yankee

Gani Jakupi, born in 1956 in Kosovo, is a Kosovo-Albanian graphic novel author, journalist, and jazz composer.

== Biography ==
Gani Jakupi, born in Kosovo in 1956, published his first comic at the age of 13, in a regional Albanian-language magazine. At 17, he published in newspapers and magazines in most of the republics that made up Yugoslavia.

At the end of the 1970s, he arrived in Paris, placed his drawings in humorous magazines and some comics in fanzines. He settled in Paris. The three volume series Matador, with the story by Jakupi and drawings by Hugues Labiano, appeared between 1991 and 1994 by Glénat. Once the series ended, Jakupi moved to Barcelona, Spain, and gradually left comics. He works in illustration, design, translation (among others, works by Danilo Kiš or Quim Monzó) or journalism. After publishing a few short stories, he wrote a thriller, Día de gracia (SIMS, 2001), and edited political analysis texts (Un paréntesis en el silencio). That same year, he composed the soundtrack for a short documentary accompanying the exhibition "Tiran(i)a" in the Center for Contemporary Culture in Barcelona.

In 2005, he founded a CD-books collection (composed of comics, musical reviews and CDs) for a Barcelona publisher, on sometimes forgotten personalities of jazz and popular music. Futuroplis published his Le Roi Invisible in 2009. The album won the Brick d'Or at the Toulouse Festival. This was followed by Les amants de Sylvia (Futuropolis, 2010) and The last image (Collection Noctambule, 2012), nominated for the Prix France Info and the Prix Médecins sans frontières. He adapted his detective story previously published in Spanish, under the title Jour de Grâce, with Marc N'Guessan drawing (Dupuis, 2010) into a comic strip.

In 2010, in Douai, boards from the Le Roi Invisible were exhibited alongside those produced by Henri Matisse for his book Jazz (1947).

In 2014, his Retour au Kosovo, illustrated by Jorge González, appeared in the Aire Libre collection (Dupuis). This graphic novel which describes the first post-war months in Kosovo wins the special jury prize at Romics (Rome International Comic Festival) 2015 and that of the Cognito foundation at the Brussels book fair, also in 2015. In the spring 2016 issue, the journal XXI publishes its graphic story Havana, USA, a graphic reportage on the Cuban community in Miami.

In 2006, while searching for documentation for a comic book on Benny Moré, Jakupi came across a photo that sparked his curiosity: it depicts a North American guerrilla in Cuba. More than twelve years later, his graphic novel El Comandante Yankee (Aire Libre, 2019) and his historical essay Enquête sur El Comandante Yankee (La Table Ronde, 2019) tackle a little-known aspect of the Cuban revolution. In November 1957, in parallel with Fidel Castro, Eloy Gutiérrez Menoyo, son of Spanish Republican refugees, established the "Segundo Frente Nacional de l'Escambray", a second rebel army which fought the dictator Batista. One of Menoyo's officers was William Alexander Morgan, a former US soldier, known by the nickname of Comandante Yankee. Adored as heroes, Morgan and Menoyo were then ousted by Castro, and their very existence obscured. Jakupi made three trips to Cuba, two to Miami, obtained documents and manuscripts like Menoyo's memoirs, campaign diaries from various rebel officers, orders of wars and passes, browsed publications from the period, consulted various works and carried out interviews with twenty characters of this forgotten epic. Jakupi has also been entrusted with a large quantity of photographs from private collections. El Comandante Yankee is a roman fleuve in form of a graphic novel (224 pages in large format) which, among other things, depicts the conflict of the various rebel factions for the seizure of power after the escape of the dictator, as well as the role of the United States in these stratagems.

Le Serpent à deux têtes (The Two-Headed Serpent, 2022) is the first graphic novel of this size (152 pages) dedicated to the Aboriginal Australians. According to the Radio chrétienne francophone “(It) recalls Robinson Crusoe, with a rather chamanique approach. And tragical one, as well.”. The "Ligne Claire" is even more direct: “Between (Jack) London and (Daniel) Defoe !". For the "Univers Comics", “(It) echoes the recent elucubrations about the Great Replacement that finds here its real meaning, because the history teaches us that it was the native populations that were replaced through violence, expropriation, and spoliation.". The "Focus Littéraire" questions itself “Are we the other when the other demands it, and when we’re unable to express the reality of our birth, constrained to meet the expectations of a society?”.

In parallel, he publishes the jazz album Aldea with his Gani Jakupi Connections, which brings together a total of 17 musicians from different backgrounds and cultures: Kosovo, Spain, France, Switzerland, Argentina, Uruguay, Venezuela, Brazil, Moldova, etc. In this first CD, Jakupi limits himself to composing, arranging and producing all the material, but takes the guitar for the following project, while recomposing the formation, in order to introduce a bandoneon and a cello, among others. The result was the album Kismet, released in 2014. The Connections performed on stage for the first time in Albania, Tirana and Shkodra, and then sold out at the Barcelona Jamboree and at the Éclats d'Émail festival in Limoges.

As a story writer, he has co-written with Denis Lapière Barcelona, âme noire, with art by Ruben Pellejero, Eduard Torrents and Martin Pardo (Aire Libre, 2024). The Belgian daily Le Soir salutes it for restituting Barcelona as a symbol of resistance against the Francoist Spain. This graphic novel brought Jakupi a second prize from Cognito, in 2025.

Jakupi's works have been published in French, Spanish, Italian, Portuguese, Catalan, English, German, Dutch, Russian, Polish, Serbo-Croatian, Bosnian, Macedonian and Albanian. In 2013, the publishing house KOHA (Kosovo) translated The Last Image (Imazhi i fundit) which thus became the first comic book album ever published in Albanian. The Greek cultural association “To Kafeneio ton Ideon” (under the high patronage of UNESCO) awarded to Gani Jakupi, for the entire work, the “Alexander the Great” prize (previously awarded to personalities such as Melina Mercouri or Jack Lang).

In 2019, Jakupi makes his old dream come true: a comic book festival in his homeland. GRAN Fest hits hard from its first edition, with guests like Hermann, Frank Margerin, Dave McKean, Marcello Quinatanilla or Fumio Obata. Immediately integrated by the French Ministry of Culture into the BD 2020 network (which will become BD 20/21), the festival marks a pause forced by the pandemic, and resumes in 2021, highlighting women authors, with Judith Vanistedael, Aude Mermilliud, Edith Grattery and Lili Sohn.

== Works ==
=== Graphic novels ===
- Barcelona, âme noire, story by Gani Jakupi and Denis Lapière, art by Rubén Pellejero, Eduard Torrents, Martín Pardo, Dupuis, Aire Libre Collection, 2024 ISBN 978-2800162218
- Le Serpent à deux têtes, story and art by Gani Jakupi, Soleil Productions, collection Noctambule, 2022 ISBN 978-2-302-09092-7
- El Comandante Yankee, story and art by Gani Jakupi, Dupuis, Aire Libre collection, 2019 ISBN 978-2-800-15200-4
- Retour au Kosovo, story by Gani Jakupi, art by Jorge González, Dupuis, Aire Libre collection, 2014 ISBN 978-2-800-15626-2
- La dernière image, story and art by Gani Jakupi, Soleil Productions, Noctambule collection, 2012 ISBN 978-2-302-02062-7
- Les amants de Sylvia, story and art by Gani Jakupi, Futuropolis, 2010 ISBN 978-2-7548-0304-5
- Jour de grâce, story by Gani Jakupi, art by Marc N'Guessan, Dupuis, General Public collection, 2010 ISBN 978-2-8001-4650-8
- Le Roi Invisible, story and art by Gani Jakupi, Futuropolis, 2009 ISBN 978-2-7548-0206-2
- Blues in the Dark, in the CD-book "Montoliu plays Tete", story and art by Gani Jakupi, DiscMedi, 2005
- Matador, story by Gani Jakupi, art by Hugues Labiano, Glénat, graphic collection
1. Lune Gitane, 1992 ISBN 2-7234-1399-3
2. La Part du feu, 1993 ISBN 2-7234-1601-1
3. L'Orgueilleux, 1994 ISBN 2-7234-1725-5

=== Historical essays ===
- Investigation of El Comandante Yankee: Another Story of the Cuban Revolution, by Gani Jakupi, La Table Ronde, 2019 ISBN 978-2-710-38758-9

=== Music ===
- Gani Jakupi Connections Aldea, 2012 EAN 8-424094-010943
- Gani Jakupi Connections Kismet, 2014 EAN 8-437003-875359
