= Geshi =

Geshi may refer to:

- Xiazhi, a term relating to East Asian calendars
- Geshi, Iran (disambiguation), places in Iran
