= La Coubre explosion =

1960 deadly explosion of a French cargo ship in Havana, Cuba

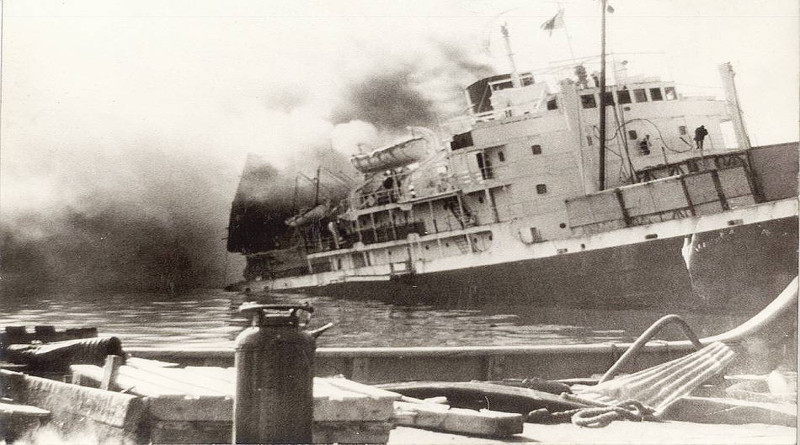
- La Coubre after the explosion
- Date: 4 March 1960
- Location: Havana, Cuba
- Deaths: 75 to 100

The French freighter La Coubre (French: [la kubʁ]) exploded in the harbour of Havana, Cuba, on 4 March 1960 while it was unloading 76 tons of grenades and munitions. Seventy-five to 100 people were killed, and many were injured. Fidel Castro alleged it was an act of sabotage on the part of the United States, which denied any involvement.

== Events ==
La Coubre, a 4,310-ton French vessel, was on 4 March 1960 unloading her cargo of 76 tons of Belgian munitions she had transported from the port of Antwerp in Belgium to Havana. Unloading explosive ordnance directly onto the dock in Havana was against port regulations. Ships with such cargoes were supposed to be moored in the center of the harbor and their high-risk cargo unloaded onto lighters. The ship exploded at 3:10 pm. Thirty minutes after the first explosion, while hundreds of people were involved in a rescue operation organized by the Cuban military, a second, more powerful explosion killed and injured more people. (Note: Father John McKniff (1905–1994), a Roman Catholic Augustinian missionary priest from Media, Pennsylvania, was thrown to the pavement by the second explosion. Although stunned, he survived and continued his work until 1968, leaving amid communist restrictions on religious activities. In 2002, he was named Servant of God after a cause for beatification had been opened. As of October 2025, the cause is still open.)

At the time of the explosion, Che Guevara (who was a trained doctor) was in a meeting at the National Institute of Agrarian Reform (NIAR) headquarters. He drove to the scene and spent the next few hours giving medical attention to the crew members, armed forces personnel, and dock workers who had been injured. The death toll was between 75 and 100; more than 200 people were injured.

== Reaction ==
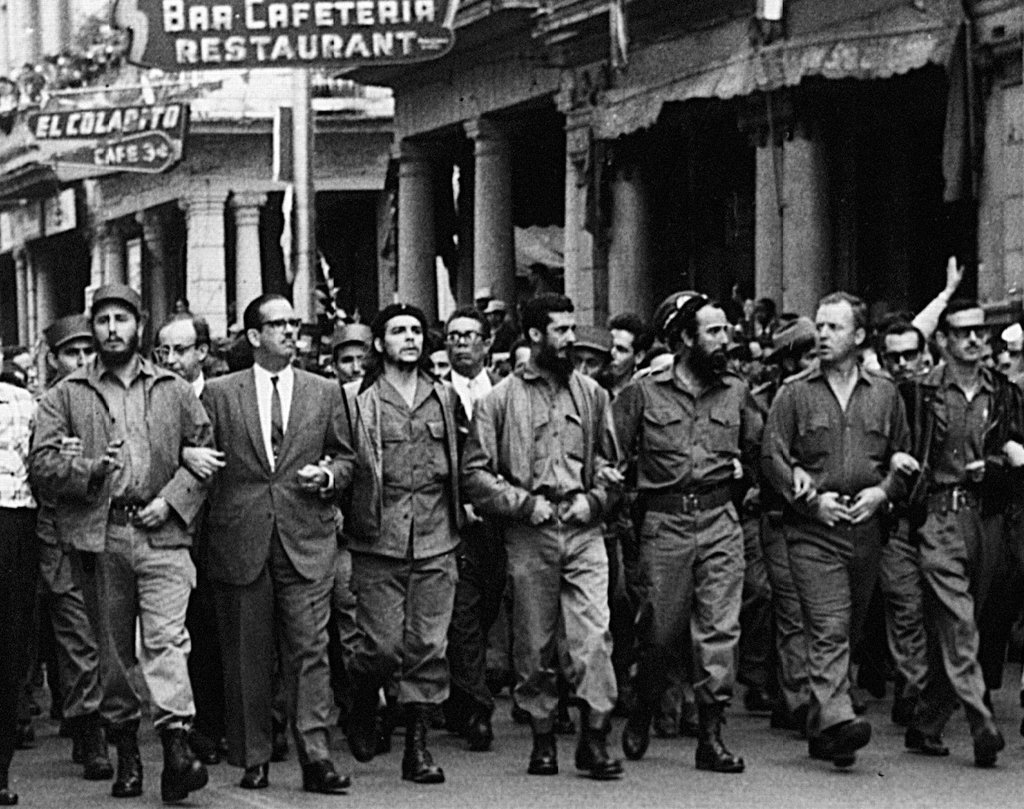
Memorial service march for victims of the La Coubre explosion, on March 5, 1960, in Havana. From left to right: Fidel Castro, Osvaldo Dorticós Torrado, Che Guevara, Augusto Martínez Sánchez, Antonio Núñez Jiménez, William Alexander Morgan, and Eloy Gutiérrez Menoyo marching to Colón Cemetery.

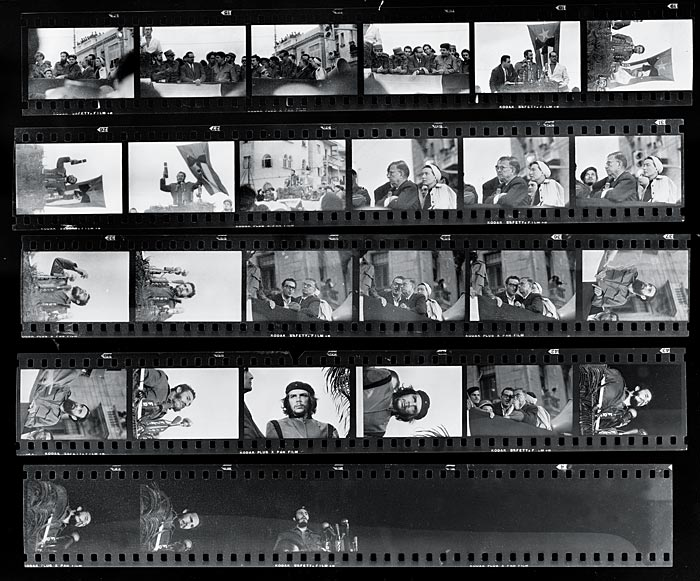
Film reel of images taken at the La Coubre memorial service, including the famous "Guerrillero Heroico" (four rows down, third from left)

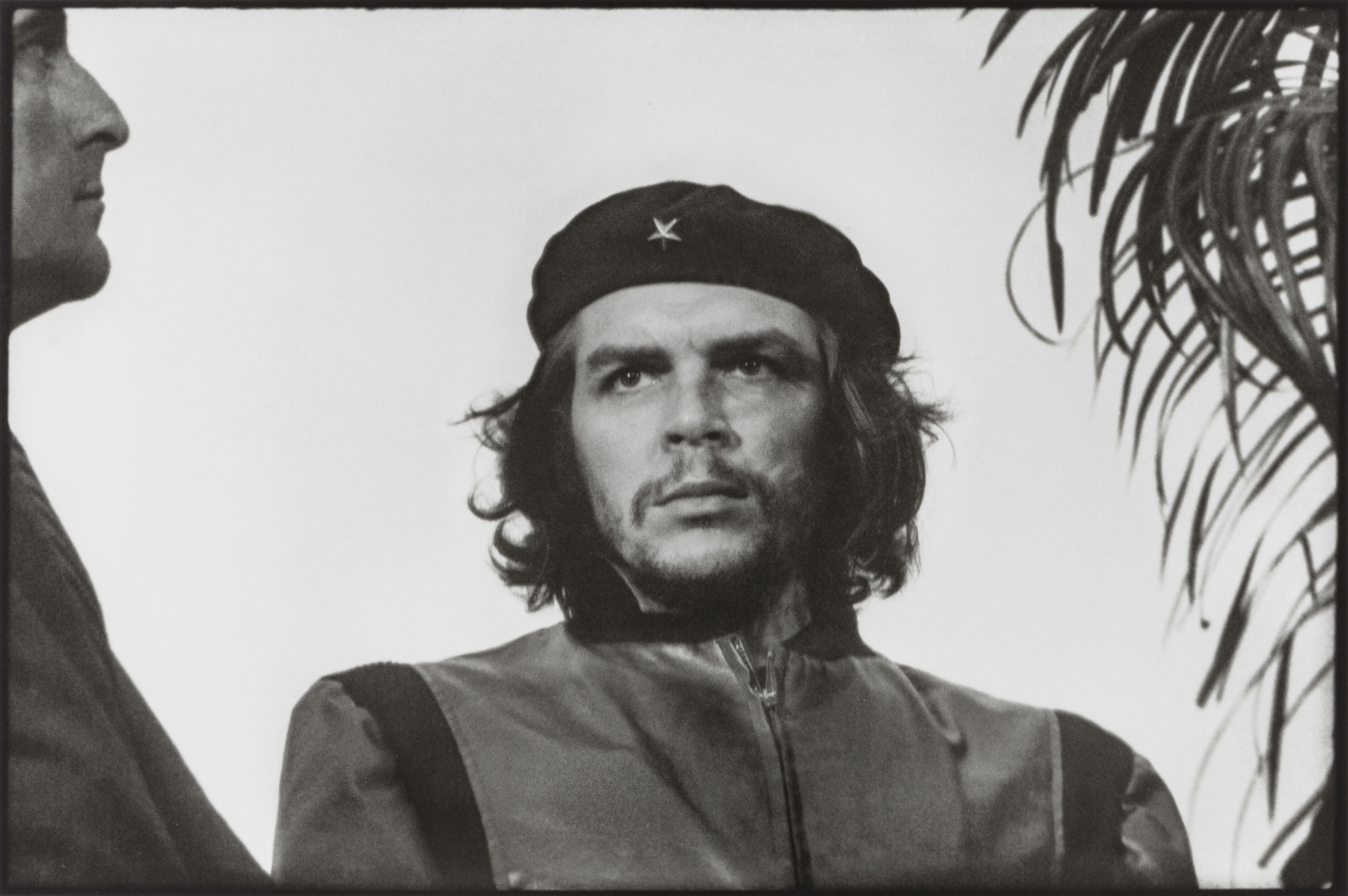
The full-frame image from which Guerrillero Heroico was cropped.

Speaking the next day at a funeral for 27 dock workers killed by the explosions, Fidel Castro said that the United States was responsible for the explosion, calling it "the work of those who do not wish us to receive arms for our defense". U.S. Secretary of State Christian Herter denied that on 7 March in a meeting with the Cuban chargé d'affaires in Washington, then delivered a formal note of protest to Cuban Foreign Minister Raul Roa on 15 March.

On 7 March, the Miami Herald reported charges made by Jack Lee Evans, an American who had just returned from Havana where he had been working for and living with William Alexander Morgan, an American who had commanded rebel forces during the Cuban Revolution. He said he had boarded the La Coubre on 2 March with Morgan and others to transport machine guns and ammunition to the NIAR. He said he had learned of a plot by an anti-communist dockworker to explode the ship, did not think Morgan was involved, and now feared for his life. Morgan denied ever being aboard the ship and said of Evans: "The kid has to be out of his mind to say a thing like that." Morgan was arrested seven months later, accused of supporting counter-revolutionaries, and executed in March 1961.

Alberto Korda took photos at the March 5 memorial service at Havana's Colón Cemetery, including the photo Guerrillero Heroico, which has become an iconic image of Che Guevara.

== Fate of La Coubre ==
La Coubre, named for a point of land along the Atlantic coast of France, La Coubre, was towed to a dry-dock in Havana Harbor where she underwent extensive temporary repairs for five months to make her sufficiently seaworthy to be towed to France. La Coubre was towed by the Dutch merchant Oostzee to Le Havre, arriving 26 September 1960. Two tugboats moved La Coubre to the French port of Rouen on the Seine. Here she underwent her permanent repairs, completed in April 1961.

When returned to service she continued to be owned and operated by the French Compagnie Générale Transatlantique until 1972, when she was sold to the Dorothea shipping company in Cyprus and renamed Barbara. Later the vessel was renamed Notios Hellas and Agia Marina until 1979 when she was sold to a Spanish company to be scrapped.
