= William Alexander Morgan =

American revolutionary

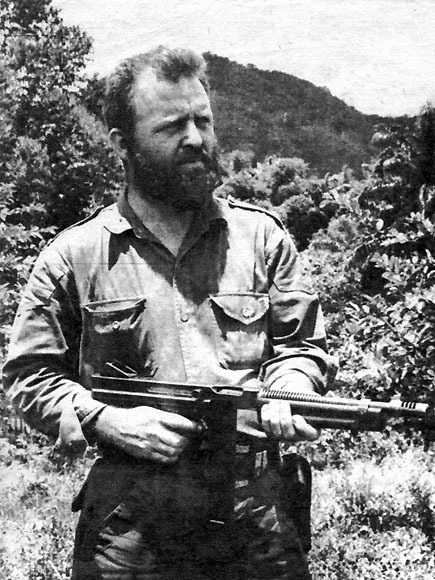
- Morgan in July 1959
- Born: April 19, 1928; Cleveland, Ohio, U.S.
- Died: March 11, 1961 (aged 32); Havana, Cuba
- Cause of death: Execution by firing squad
- Burial place: Colon Cemetery, Havana
- Citizenship: American (revoked in 1959, posthumously restored in 2009); Cuban (1959–1961)
- Occupation: Revolutionary
- Years active: 1957–1961
- Known for: Commander of the Second National Front of the Escambray
- Military career
- Allegiance: United States (until 1959)
- Branch: United States Army
- Service years: 1945–1948

William Alexander Morgan (April 19, 1928 – March 11, 1961) was an American-born Cuban guerrilla commander and revolutionary who fought in the Cuban Revolution, leading a band of rebels that drove the Cuban army from key positions in the central mountains as part of Second National Front of Escambray, thereby helping to pave the way for Fidel Castro's forces to secure victory. Morgan was one of about two dozen U.S. citizens to fight in the revolution and one of only three foreign nationals to hold the rank of comandante in the rebel forces. In the years after the revolution, Morgan became disenchanted with Castro's turn to communism and he became one of the leaders of the CIA-supplied Escambray rebellion. In 1961, he was arrested by the Cuban government and, after a military trial, executed by firing squad in the presence of Fidel and Raúl Castro.

== Life before Cuba ==
Morgan was born in Cleveland, Ohio, to Alexander Morgan and German-American Loretta Morgan (née Ruderth). Raised in an affluent Toledo neighborhood, he left high school and was often in trouble with the law. Morgan joined the United States Army after World War II and married Darlene Edgerton in 1946. The marriage was annulled after a year and a half. He was stationed with Company B, 35th Infantry Regiment, in Japan, where he fathered a son with a German-Japanese hostess named Setsuko Takeda. He went AWOL, was arrested, and escaped from custody by overpowering a guard. Recaptured, he was court-martialed in 1948, received a dishonorable discharge, and spent over two years in a federal prison.

He is said to have been skilled with firearms and was rumored to have been a Central Intelligence Agency operative, though there are no public records or witness interviews to support the claim. After his discharge from the Army, Morgan apparently also worked for a local crime syndicate.

On May 11, 1954, Morgan married Ellen Theresa May Bethel, a snake charmer, in Miami. They had two children, Anne Marie (1955) and William A. Morgan Jr. (1957).

== Cuban Revolution ==
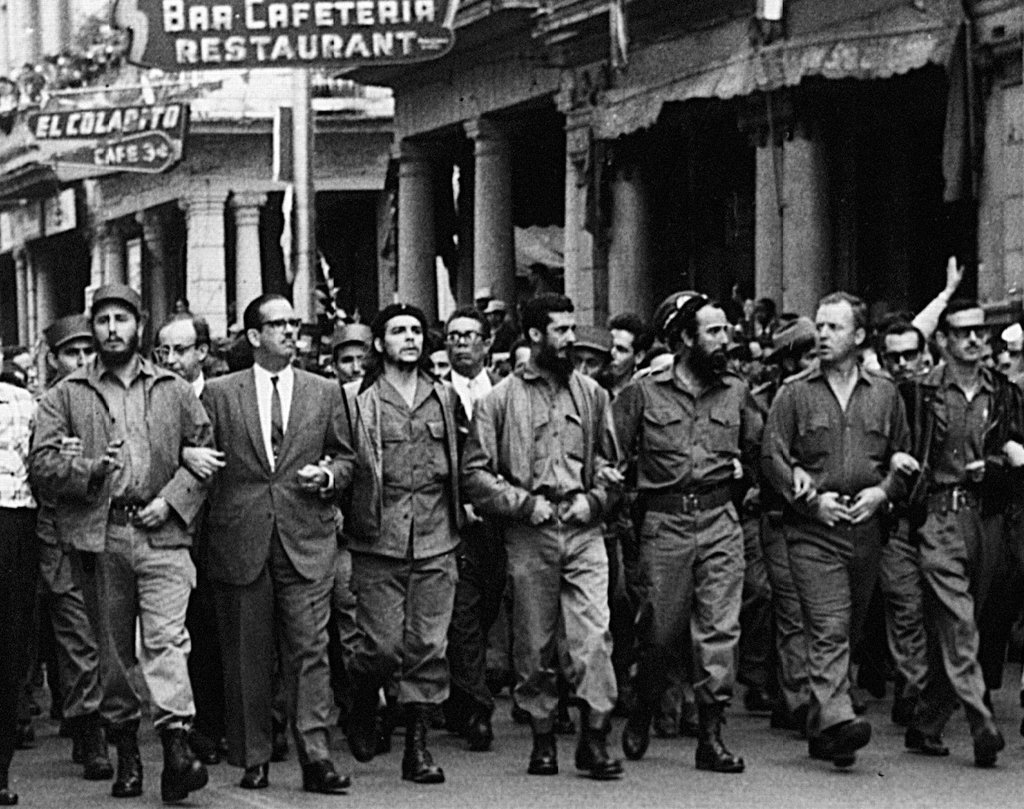
Cuban revolutionaries marching during the memorial service for the victims of the La Coubre explosion in March 1960. From left to right: Fidel Castro, Osvaldo Dorticós Torrado, Che Guevara, Augusto Martínez Sánchez, Antonio Núñez Jiménez, William Alexander Morgan and Eloy Gutiérrez Menoyo.

Opposed to the dictatorship of Fulgencio Batista, Morgan left behind his wife and children and went to Cuba in 1957, joining a guerrilla force of the Second National Front of the Escambray (Segundo Frente Nacional de Escambray or SFNE) that operated against Batista's soldiers in the Escambray Mountains in central Cuba.

After distinguishing himself in a series of battles, he was promoted to the rank of comandante, leading his own column. In 1958, he wrote a statement that appeared in the New York Times to explain his participation in Castro's revolution, "Why I Am Here". It said in part:

I am here because I believe that the most important thing for free men to do is to protect the freedom of others. I am here so that my son, when he is grown, will not have to fight or die in a land not his own, because one man or group of men try to take his liberty from him. I am here because I believe that free men should take up arms and stand together and fight and destroy the groups and forces that want to take the rights of people away.

In December 1958, Che Guevara joined forces with Morgan's group and the Directorio Revolucionario Estudantil guerrillas of the Escambray mountains. Together they captured the city of Santa Clara on December 31. Twelve hours later, Batista fled Cuba. Morgan and his men occupied the city of Cienfuegos on January 1–2, 1959.

In January 1959, he told a reporter that "all I'm interested in is settling down to a nice peaceful existence" but worried how U.S. authorities would respond to his military activities in Cuba. In March 1959, officials of the U.S. embassy in Havana warned Americans that participation in foreign military service could jeopardize their citizenship.

In August 1959, Morgan gained international attention when he helped smash a coup attempt orchestrated by Dominican Republic strongman Rafael Trujillo and others by pretending to lead the takeover while quietly divulging the plot to Fidel Castro in order to help the fledgling government.

In September 1959, the U.S. State Department revoked his citizenship, a move that was prompted by members of Congress who had supported Trujillo. Morgan promised to contest the action.

== Post-revolution activities ==
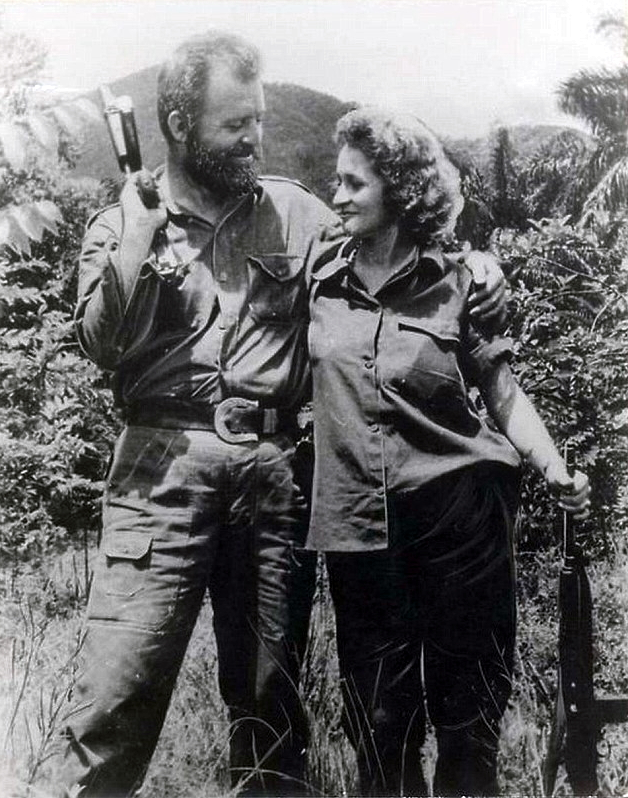
William Morgan and Olga María Rodríguez Fariñas in the mountains of Cuba.

Morgan married a Cuban, Olga María Rodríguez Fariñas, also a revolutionary, and they had two daughters. In September 1959, the FBI and American authorities revoked Morgan's U.S. citizenship. On September 24, 1959, Morgan renounced his U.S. citizenship publicly on a Havana radio station. After the revolution, Morgan developed a business of frog farming; with the legs being sold to restaurants, the skin for fashion accessories, and what remained for cattle feed. During this venture, Morgan employed around 600 workers and shipped an average of 50,000 pounds (23,000 kg) of frozen frog legs to the U.S. every month.

On March 6, 1960, the French freighter La Coubre exploded in Havana Harbor killing around 100 people. An American named Jack Lee Evans, who was in Cuba at the time of the explosion with Morgan, left for Miami a few days after the incident. While in Miami, he gave an interview with the Miami Herald suggesting that Morgan had been involved with the sabotaging of the ship, which Morgan adamantly denied. A memorial for the explosion was held a few days later. Morgan was pictured arm-in-arm walking through the streets of Havana during this memorial with prominent Cuban leaders including Castro and Che.

Throughout the struggle against Batista, Morgan was vocal about Castro's supposed anti-communist beliefs. When asked during interviews about Castro's political beliefs and where the new Cuban government was leaning, he remained firm in his belief that Castro was not a communist and that Cuba would become a capitalist parliamentary democracy.

As Castro began to reveal his socialist leanings, Morgan became disenchanted with the revolutionary government, as did other members of the SFNE, who wanted Cuba to restore elections. In the middle of June 1960, Morgan and a select few former Escambray leaders met to discuss Castro's turn towards socialism and protecting the Revolution. As the arrests of Morgan's former rebel comrades for counter-revolutionary activities started to increase, Morgan organized weapons to be smuggled to the counter-revolutionaries in the Escambray.

== Arrest and execution ==
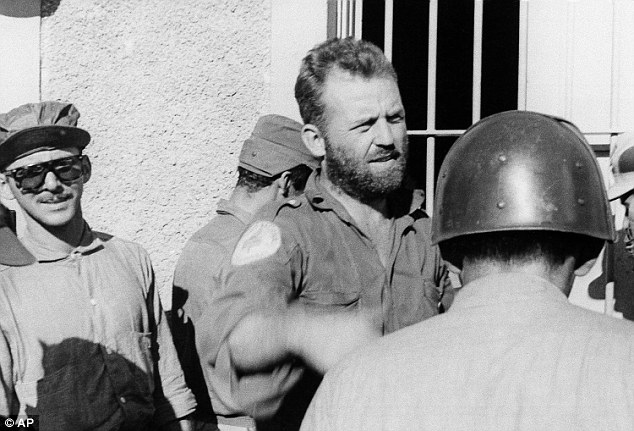
William Alexander Morgan in prison, Havana, Cuba. 1961

On October 16, 1960, Castro ordered Morgan's arrest due to counter-revolutionary activities. Three days later, Morgan was arrested while attending a meeting for the National Institute for Agrarian Reform, to which he had been summoned. Morgan was formally charged with plotting to join and lead the counter-revolutionaries who were active in the Escambray Mountains. On March 11, 1961, shortly after a military trial at La Cabaña fortress, Morgan, then 32 years old, was shot by firing squad with Fidel and Raúl Castro in attendance. One month later, 1,500 CIA trained counterrevolutionaries unsuccessfully invaded Cuba at the Bay of Pigs resulting in Castro officially declaring the Revolution a socialist endeavor.

His wife, Olga María Rodríguez Fariñas, was tried separately. She was found guilty of co-conspiracy and sentenced to 30 years in prison. She was released after 10 years. She left for the United States in 1980 during the Mariel boatlift. In a series of interviews with The Toledo Blade in 2002, she admitted that she and her husband had begun running guns to anti-Castro guerrillas because they were opposed to Castro's pro-Soviet leanings. She also said she wanted Morgan's U.S. citizenship restored and his remains returned to the United States for reburial. The newspaper stories prompted two Democratic members of the United States House of Representatives, Charles Rangel and Marcy Kaptur, to travel to Cuba in April 2002 to meet Fidel Castro and ask him to return Morgan's body. Castro agreed but the remains were never found.

In April 2007, nearly 50 years after the government stripped him of his rights in 1959 for serving in a foreign country's military, the U.S. State Department declared that Morgan's U.S. citizenship was effectively restored.

== In popular culture ==
Morgan's life remained largely out of the American eye until the 21st century when articles, documentaries, and films brought him to attention in the United States. In 2012, George Clooney planned to buy the rights and direct a film based on David Grann's 2012 New Yorker article on Morgan. Pulitzer prize-winning reporters Michael Sallah and Mitch Weiss authored the book "The Yankee Comandante: The Untold Story of Courage, Passion and One American's Fight to Liberate Cuba." Morgan was featured in 2015 on the PBS documentary series American Experience with the episode titled American Comandante.

In April 2020, Adam Driver was reported to star in a film adaptation of the New Yorker article, written and directed by Jeff Nichols, with shooting anticipated to begin in 2021.

American country-rock band Lucero detail Morgan's story on "Back in Ohio," a track off their 2021 album When You Found Me.

Morgan appears as a card in the board game Cuba Libre, part of a series of wargames simulating historic insurgency and counterinsurgency conflicts.

== See also ==
- Second National Front of Escambray
