= Geshi, Iran =

Geshi or Gashi (Persian: گشي) may refer to:

- Geshi, Deyr
- Geshi, Tangestan
