= Geshi, Tangestan =

Geshi گشي
- Village
- Location within Iran
- Coordinates: 28°46′13″N 51°27′52″E
- Country: Iran
- Province: Bushehr
- County: Tangestan
- Bakhsh: Central
- Rural District: Ahram

Population (2006)
  - Total: 210
- Time zone: UTC+3:30 (IRST)
  - Summer (DST): UTC+4:30 (IRDT)

Geshi (Persian: گشي, also Romanized as Geshī and Gashī) is a village in Ahram Rural District, in the Central District of Tangestan County, Bushehr Province, Iran. At the 2006 census, its population was 210, in 60 families.
