= Henri Gashi =

English footballer

Personal information
- Date of birth: 3 December 2001 (age 24)
- Place of birth: London, England
- Position: Midfielder

Youth career
- Bromley
- Fisher
- Bromley

Senior career*
Years	Team	Apps	(Gls)
2021–2022	Besa Kavajë	20	(2)
- * Club domestic league appearances and goals as of 19 May 2023

Henri Gashi (born 3 December 2001) is an English professional footballer who plays as a midfielder.

== Club career ==
In 2019, Gashi moved from Bromley to Fisher. At some point, he moved back to Bromley, but was signed by Albanian side Besa Kavajë in February 2021.

Gashi made his senior debut on 27 March 2021 away to Elbasani in a 2–1 win and scored his first professional goal on 23 April 2021 against Tomori Berat in a 3–1 away loss.

== Career statistics ==
=== Club ===
As of 7 May 2022.

Appearances and goals by club, season and competition
Club	Season	League			Cup		Other		Total	
Club	Season	Division	Apps	Goals	Apps	Goals	Apps	Goals	Apps	Goals
Besa Kavajë	2020–21	Kategoria e Parë	6	1	0	0	0	0	6	1
Besa Kavajë	2021–22	Kategoria e Parë	14	1	2 (Note: Appearances in the Albanian Cup)	0	0	0	16	1
Career total			20	2	2	0	0	0	22	2
