= Valdet Gashi =

German kickboxer, Muay Thai fighter, ISIS member

Valdet Enver Gashi
- Born: April 10, 1986; Pristina, SAP Kosovo, SFR Yugoslavia (present-day Kosovo)
- Died: July 4, 2015 (aged 29); Damascus, Syria
- Military career
- Allegiance: Islamic State

Valdet Enver Gashi (born in Pristina, Kosovo, former Yugoslavia on 10 April 1986 — 4 July 2015 in Damascus, Syria) was a German terrorist, kickboxer and Muay Thai fighter of Albanian origin and European and two-times world champion in the super lightweight division. He died in unclear circumstances after joining Islamic State (IS) militants in Syria.

== Sporting career ==
Gashi arrived in Germany as a six-year-old Albanian refugee. He grew up in Neumarkt district of Bavaria where he was attracted to kickboxing and Muay Thai boxing also practicing break dancing passionately, before turning exclusively into sports. He found most success as a Muay Thai kickboxer and traveled to Thailand to train and fight in sports events. He regularly trained at the Elite Fight Club in Bangkok as a respected "foreign fighter" in this Thai sports art form becoming a role model and media star. EliteBoxing TV put a 45-minute reality show / documentary release featuring Valdet Gashi. He was promoted and sponsored in Thailand by Bjoern Schaufler, founder of "Thai 4 More" sports promotion company. He reportedly fought in more than 106 events in Thailand in 4 1/2 years. He also fought competitively in other countries like Malaysia, South Korea, China, Iran.

Gashi also met his future wife, a former top model in Thailand, marrying her after she converted to Islam. They had two daughters. The family resided in Singen, Germany.

Gashi turned professional in 2009 losing his debut pro boxing fight to Laszlo Robert Balogh with a KO. But he went on to win subsequent fights against Chainoi Suksumrit in 2009, Krisztian Zambo and Ibragim Zeliev in 2010 and Victor Sanicki in 2011. He won the European title and later became two times world title holder in kickboxing.

== Militantism and death ==
In January 2015, Gashi left Germany to join up with Islamic State militants in Syria. To cover his whereabouts, he claimed he was headed to Thailand on a sports mission. He was married and had two children and left them behind when he joined the extremists. He later revealed that he had joined IS and was helping in patrolling in the Manbij area and the Euphrates River near the Syrian-Turkish border looking for smugglers trading in cigarettes, alcohol and drugs, all forbidden in IS-controlled areas. His father Enver Gashi pleaded with him through the media to return to his family, but to no avail. In a later interview with the Swiss German SRF station in June 2015, he said he was "trying to help build a modern caliphate in Syria" adding: "If I die while doing good, I of course will be glad." His death was widely reported on 6 July 2015 after his brother confirmed the death of Valdet on 4 July.
