= Augusto Martínez Sánchez =

Cuban politician (1923–2013)

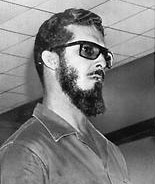
- Born: 1923; Mayarí, Cuba
- Died: 2 February 2013; Havana, Cuba
- Occupation: Revolutionary
- Military career
- Service years: 1958–1964

Augusto Martínez Sánchez (1923 – 2 February 2013) was a Cuban lawyer and politician, and one of the commanders of the Cuban Revolution close to Fidel Castro. Martínez Sánchez was a member of the July 26 Movement since April 1958 and participated in the guerrilla struggle in the Sierra Maestra against the government of Fulgencio Batista, attached to the Second Eastern Front "Frank País", under the direct orders of Raúl Castro.

== Military Prosecutor ==
In 1959 he was appointed Military Prosecutor directing the purges against the military and police forces that had served Batista. From this position, he was responsible for the execution of those Batista elements who had committed crimes against humanity against the Cuban civilian population.

== Minister of National Defense ==
Upon the triumph of the rebel forces, he was appointed Minister of National Defense of the first cabinet of the revolutionary government chaired by Manuel Urrutia, according to a decree of January 10, 1959, but always under the direct orders of Fidel Castro.

Martínez Sánchez was the first substitute as Prime Minister on Castro's trip to New York in April 1959. In December of that same year, Martínez Sánchez's car was the target of an attack by opponents of the revolutionary government, in which three of his escorts were injured.

== Revolutionary Court ==
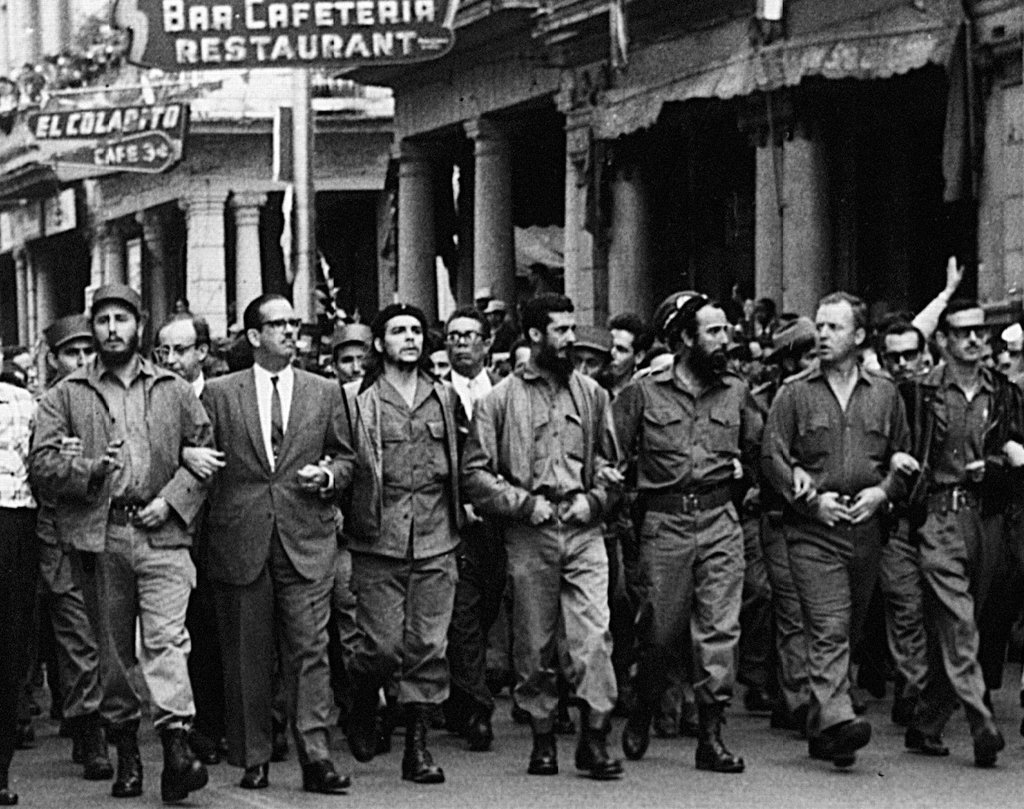
Photo was taken on March 5, 1960, in Havana, Cuba, at a memorial service march for victims of the La Coubre explosion. From left to right: Fidel Castro, Osvaldo Dorticós Torrado, Che Guevara, Augusto Martínez Sánchez, Antonio Núñez Jiménez, William Alexander Morgan and Eloy Gutiérrez Menoyo, marching to Colón Cemetery. (Sanchez: middle)

On March 29, 1962, he was appointed Judge of the Revolutionary Court that tried the participants in the Invasion of the Bay of Pigs on April 17, 1961. Commanders Juan Almeida Bosque, Guillermo García, Sergio del Valle, and Manuel Piñeiro were also members of this Court. He worked also with Piñeiro in the Ministry of the Interior.

== Minister of Labor ==
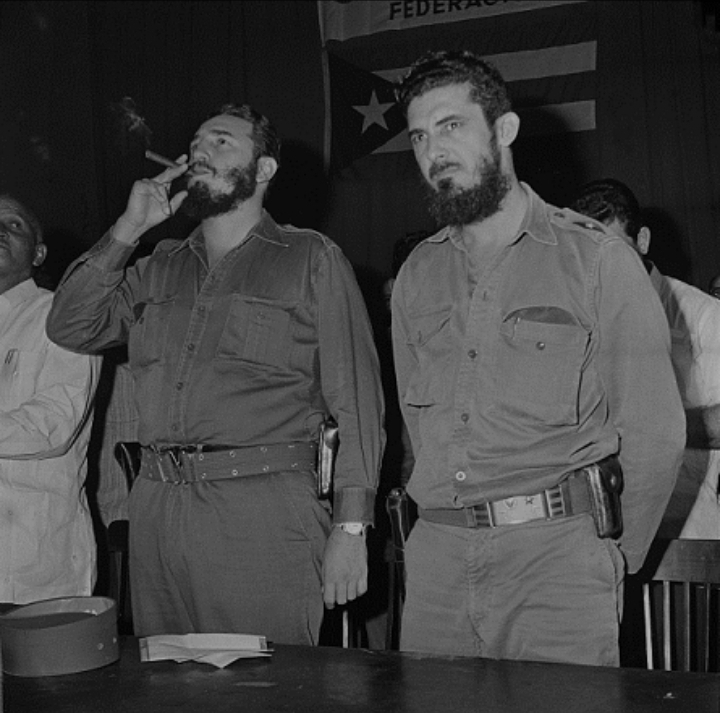
Fidel Castro with Augusto Martinez Sanchez in a CTC meeting, 1960

At the beginning of the sixties, he was appointed Minister of Labor. In 1964 he was removed from this position by Fidel Castro personally due to strong accusations of corruption.

== Suicide attempt ==
On December 8, 1964, apparently as a result of errors in his work, Augusto Martínez Sánchez shot himself in the head but survived his suicide attempt. He never returned to public life. He went into retirement with the rank of colonel in the late 1980s.

Between October and December 2010, he traveled with permission to Miami, United States of America, where his eldest son Augusto Martínez resided since the early eighties; later the Cuban ex-military man returned to the island.

His last wish was to be cremated and his ashes deposited in the Veterans' Pantheon of the Colón Cemetery, Havana, Cuba.
