= Eloy Gutiérrez Menoyo =

Cuban revolutionary (1934–2012)

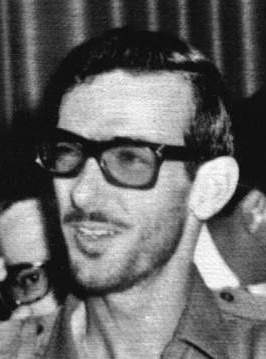
- Eloy Gutiérrez in Havana, Cuba, 1959
- Born: December 8, 1934; Madrid, Spain
- Died: October 26, 2012 (aged 77); Havana, Cuba
- Occupation: Revolutionary
- Years active: 1945–2012
- Known for: Major of the Second National Front of Escambray, Havana Presidential Palace attack (1957)

Eloy Gutiérrez Menoyo (Spanish pronunciation: [eˈloj ɣuˈtjeres meˈnoʝo]; December 8, 1934 – October 26, 2012) was a revolutionary who led the guerrilla force Second National Front of Escambray during the Cuban Revolution against Fulgencio Batista and later opposed the government of Fidel Castro over its pro-Soviet leanings.

== Life ==
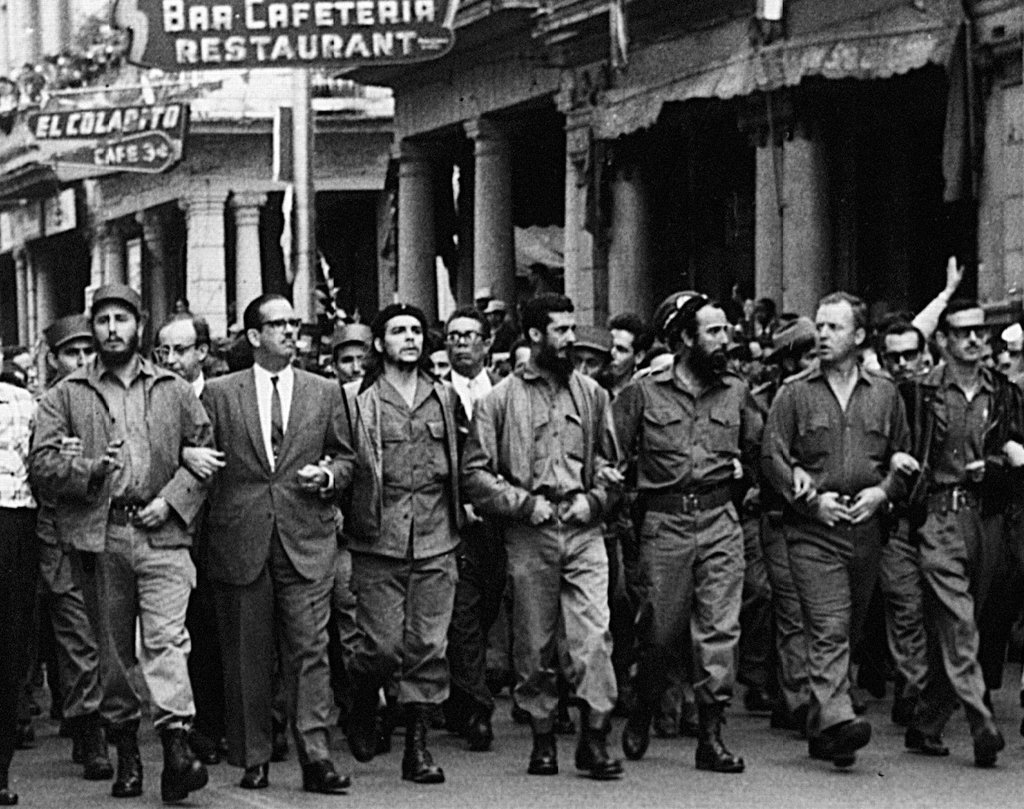
From left to right: Fidel Castro, Osvaldo Dorticós Torrado, Che Guevara, Augusto Martínez Sánchez, Antonio Núñez Jiménez, William Alexander Morgan and Eloy Gutiérrez Menoyo.

Gutiérrez Menoyo was born in Madrid in 1934, into a Spanish family active in the Spanish Civil War. The family emigrated to Cuba in 1945.

In March 1957, he and his brother, Carlos, were part of an attack on the Presidential Palace of Fulgencio Batista. His older brother did not survive the attack.

Afterwards, Gutiérrez Menoyo created and led the rebel group Second National Front of Escambray, which fought against president Batista′s dictatorial rule alongside Fidel Castro′s 26th of July Movement and the Revolutionary Directorate of 13 March Movement.

On January 3 1959, Gutiérrez Menoyo and his troops entered Havana a few days before Fidel Castro. Eloy was hailed as one of the Commanders Of The Revolution. Gutiérrez Menoyo's own army was absorbed into the army of Fidel Castro but he was permitted to retain the rank of Major, the highest rank in Cuba at the time.

However, Gutiérrez Menoyo and many of his senior officers were never offered a post in the Castro administration. He grew dissatisfied with the Castro administration and in September–October 1959, Eloy and some of his men from the old 1st version of the Second National Front, which was formed in 1957 as a pro-Castro group, formed the 2nd version of the Second National Front, which was an anti-Castro group.

In January 1961, Gutiérrez Menoyo and about 12 military and civilian supporters fled to the US on a boat. He settled in Miami, Florida, where he helped create Alpha 66.

After the assassination of John F. Kennedy in 1963, Gutiérrez Menoyo led an armed incursion into Cuba in December 1964, but was captured, jailed, and tortured, being beaten nearly to death by guards. He was sentenced to death for the revolt, which was later commuted to 30 years in prison. After 22 years in prison, Gutiérrez Menoyo was freed in 1986 after a petition by the Spanish government. Gutiérrez Menoyo then went into exile in Spain. Eloy then returned to Miami, Florida where he formed Cambio Cubano or Cuban Change in 1992.

In 2003, Gutiérrez Menoyo returned to Cuba where he would remain for the rest of his life as a "tolerated dissident". Gutiérrez Menoyo passed away on October 26, 2012 after suffering a heart attack.

In 2021, a declassified Federal Bureau of Investigation memo stated that Gutiérrez Menoyo and other Alpha 66 members were United States Army intelligence assets in 1964.

Gutiérrez Menoyo had at least three wives. He had a daughter in Puerto Rico with his first wife; his second wife, Gladys, remained in Florida with their three sons. His third wife was Flor Ester Torres Sanabria.

== See also ==
- Faure Chomón
- Augusto Martínez Sánchez
- José Antonio Echeverría
- Rolando Cubela Secades

== Name pronunciation ==
Name pronunciation in English
