= Gashi (singer) =

Gezim Gashi
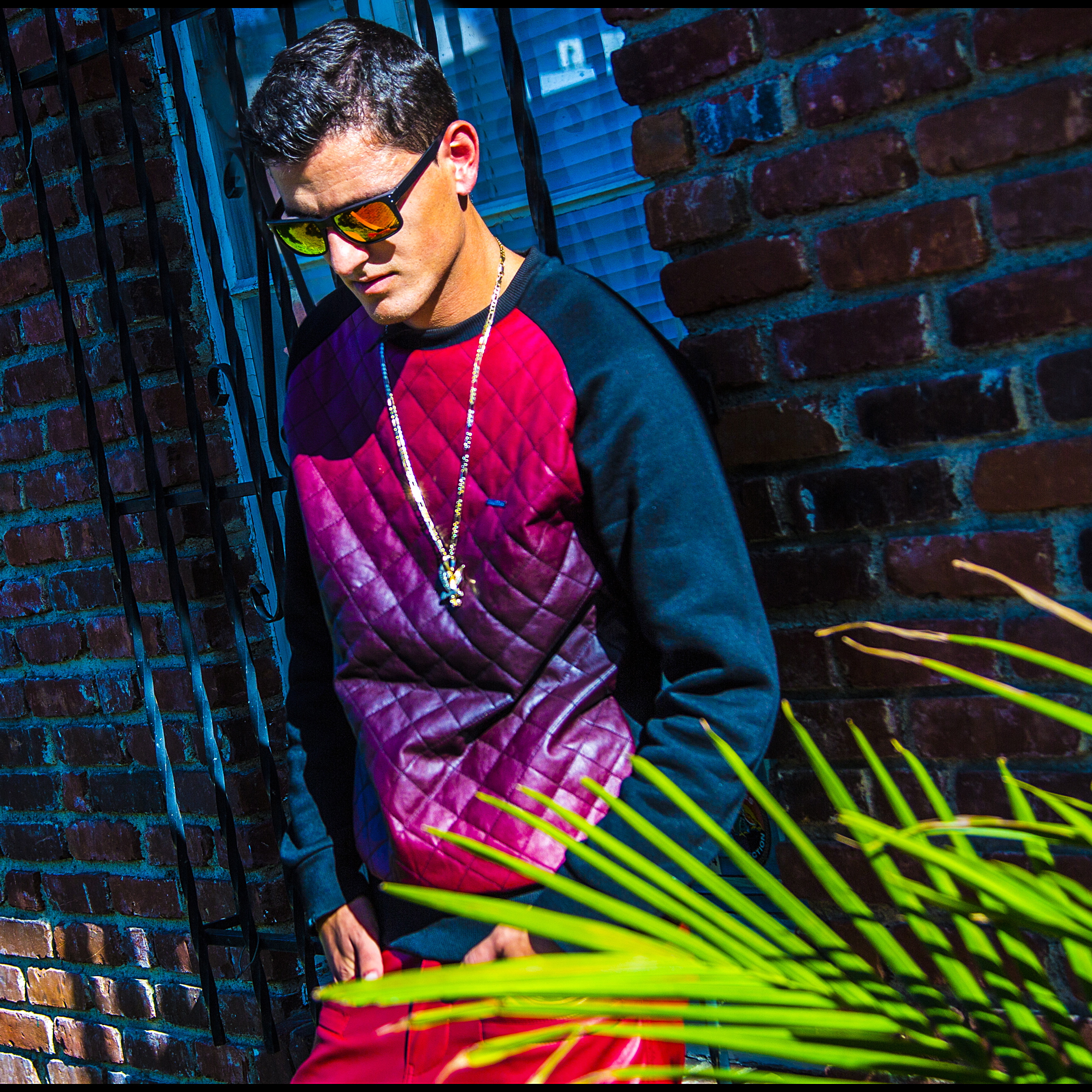
- Gashi

Background information
- Born: Gëzim Gashi; June 29, 1990 (age 36); Pristina, SR Serbia, SFR Yugoslavia
- Origin: Alvesta, Sweden
- Occupations: Entrepreneur, singer, songwriter

Gezim Gashi (Albanian: Gëzim Gashi; born June 29, 1990), is a Swedish singer and entrepreneur with roots from Kosovo. He achieved success with his covers on YouTube, which later were removed due to copyright issues. In 2011, he moved to Los Angeles to pursue his music career.
