= Second National Front of the Escambray =

Cuban guerilla group

- Segundo Frente Nacional del Escambray (SFNE)
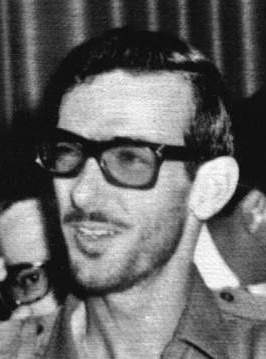
- Comandante Eloy Gutiérrez Menoyo
- Leaders: Eloy Gutiérrez Menoyo and Armando Fleites
- Founded: 1957
- Dissolved: 1964
- Split from: Revolutionary Directorate of 13 March
- Country: Cuba
- Active regions: Escambray Mountains, Sancti Spíritus, Villa Clara, Cienfuegos
- Ideology: Anti-Castroism; Anti-communism; Anti-Batista; Cuban nationalism (Left-wing nationalism); Patriotism; Social democracy
- Political position: Left-wing
- Wars: Cuban Revolution and Escambray rebellion

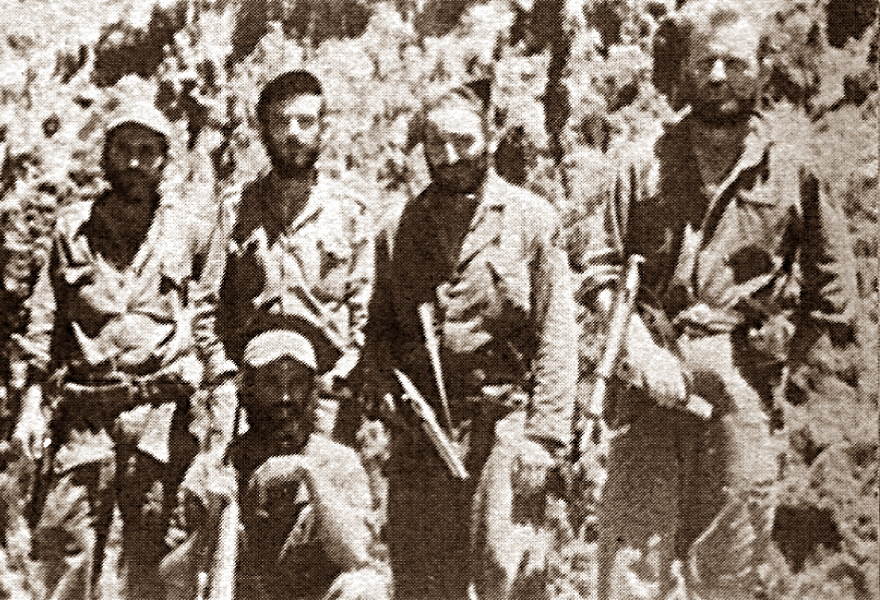
Nene Français, Eloy Gutiérrez Menoyo, José García, Henry Fuerte, William Morgan in the Escambray mountains.

Second National Front of the Escambray (Spanish: Segundo Frente Nacional del Escambray) was an independent guerrilla group led by Eloy Gutiérrez Menoyo and Dr. Armando Fleites and included Roger Redondo, Ramiro Lorenzo, Jorge Castellón, Jesús Carreras Saya, Lázaro Artola, Genaro Arroyo, and others in the Cuban central Escambray Mountains. William Alexander Morgan was also a part of the Escambray group. While initially the group supported Fidel Castro in his efforts to overthrow Cuban dictator Fulgencio Batista, after Castro took power some of its members joined former Batista soldiers and local farmers during the Escambray Rebellion (1959–1965) opposing Castro.

== History ==
=== Anti-Batista Military Action (1957–1959) ===
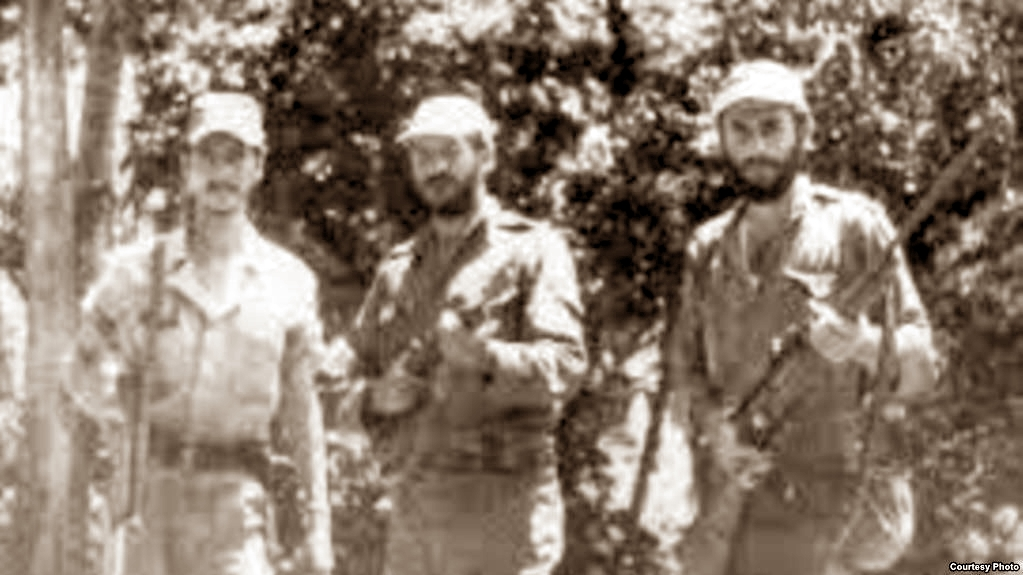
Second National Front of Escambray Comandantes Lázaro Artola, Dr. Armando Fleites, and Genaro Arroyo

The rebel group fought against president Batista's rule. The Second Front was a splinter group from the Directorio Revolucionario de Marzo 13 (DR-13-M) (English:Revolutionary Directorate of March 13) responsible for the coordinated attack on March 13, 1957, on Batista's Presidential Palace organized by DR-13-M leader José Antonio Echeverría, who died the same day in a related incident. Some important members of the Second National Front of Escambray were Max Lesnik and Lázaro Artola.

The DR-13-M's "Escambray Manifesto" of February 24, 1958 envisaged simultaneous urban and rural guerrilla warfare against Batista. It called for the restoration of the Constitution of 1940, and for social revolution, while attacking "those who only a few years ago supported the Nazis in the conquered lands of Europe". As the manifesto circulated throughout the island, the Escambray guerrillas gained strength.

Eloy Gutiérrez Menoyo and the National Front of Escambray were the first group to march into Havana on January 3, 1959, as Castro and the 26th of July Movement arrived a few days later on January 8, 1959. After the success of the Revolution the National Front of Escambray was absorbed by Castro's army and many leaders of the movement were considered to be Heroes of the Rebellion. Despite the success National Front members such as Menoyo, were not included or offered jobs in Castro's government. These tensions quickly escalated to a resurrection of the National Front Movement in the form of the Second National Front of Escambray in September 1959.

=== Early Anti-Castro Years and U.S. Support (1959–1961) ===
Upon establishing an anti-Castro movement Menoyo retreated back to the Escambray Mountains, the base of the last revolution. The movement became popular among farmers who did not support the collectivization enforced by the Castro government thus leading to the movement leading targeted attacks on agricultural hubs and field burnings. It was through these actions that the movement engaged the Castro regime as it was not strong enough to engage in a direct conflict revolution. After Fidel Castro announced his ties to the Soviet Union, the United States began to support the National Front in order to oppose the spread of Communism to the western hemisphere. One of the leading figures in acquiring American aid for the revolution was William Alexander Morgan, an American who had fought in the revolution and joined the anti-Castro movement. Morgan was a former member of the U.S. Army and acted as the main point of communication between the American government and the Escambray movement. Morgan moved into the position of Commander in the movement as he was favored by the U.S. as strong opposition to Castro and potential transition leader of the people. However, upon Morgan's capture and execution in March 1961 the movement was dealt its first major defeat.

Before Morgan's capture and death, the United States was in close contact with the National Front formulating a plan to attack the Castro regime directly and restore an anti-communist government. This plan was constructed in coordination with the Eisenhower administration during the American President's second term, but the planning took place too close to the end of Eisenhower's term and would have to postponed until the next President took office. With the election of John F. Kennedy it was expected that the operation would be put on hold in order for the new administration to be informed of the situation. In January 1961 Menoyo took a small group of Front members and traveled to Florida to form Alpha 66 an elite division of Cuban fighters to participate in the planned operation known as the Bay of Pigs Invasion. However, the Kennedy Administration greenlighted the operation for April 17, 1961, and Alpha 66 was unable to deploy. The invasion was unsuccessful as the Cuban fighters were outgunned causing the United States to call off the attack. After the failure of the Bay of Pigs Invasion U.S. support began to dwindle as the movement was handed its second major defeat in a matter of months.

=== Late Years and Defeat (1962–1964) ===
Following a series of tactical defeats, the National Front persisted in operation despite losing two leaders. Menoyo remained in Florida with the Alpha 66 and a small collection of leaders maintain organized strikes on farms and industrial outskirts. This period prior to the Cuban Missile Crisis in October 1962, saw a stagnation of movement operations as strikes became more routinized. This stagnation was due to the series of defeats the movement suffered in 1961, thus preventing the group from engaging in any major operations with support from the U.S. as communications with the Americans decreased after the failure of the Bay of Pigs Invasion. Following the Cuban Missile Crisis one of the conditions of peace between the United States and Soviet Union was for the United States to cut all aid to Cuban insurgencies. This meant that the Second National Front of Escambray would no longer have American support of any kind. The absence of American aid meant that munitions and medical supplies would no longer be provided thus further prohibiting the movement from any major conflict as they would not be able to treat the injured.

The final defeat of the movement came in 1964 when Menoyo returned from Florida in December 1964, to mount a coastal assault in northern Cuba. The result was Menoyo being captured by the Cuban Government and the leadership of the movement surrendering formally to the regime. This marked the end of the Second National Front of Escambray.

== See also ==
- Escambray rebellion
- Escambray Mountains
