= Antonio Núñez Jiménez =

Cuban revolutionary and academic (1923–1998)

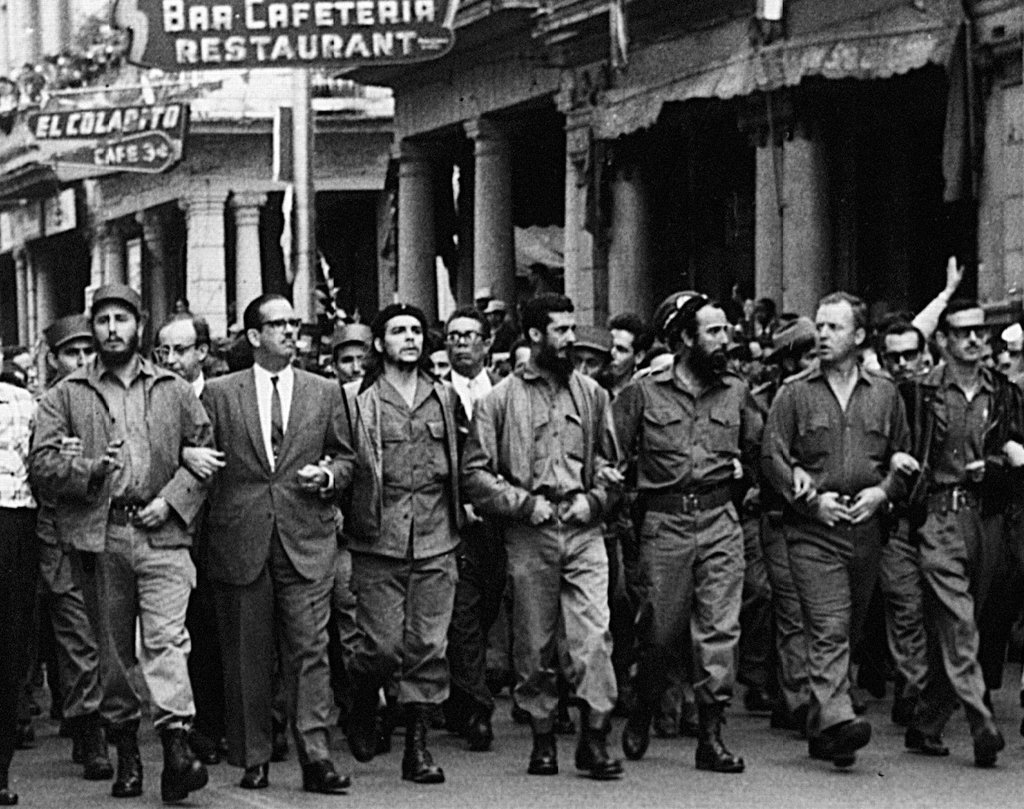
Leaders of the memorial march in Havana on 5 May 1960, for the victims of the La Coubre freight ship explosion (Jimenez: fifth from left side in front row)

Antonio Núñez Jiménez was a Cuban geographer, speleologist, archaeologist, scientist and revolutionary.

Núñez was born in Alquízar, Havana Province (current Artemisa Province) on April 20, 1923. In 1950, he received his first doctorate from the University of Havana, and later received a second doctorate from the Lomonosov Moscow State University of Moscow.

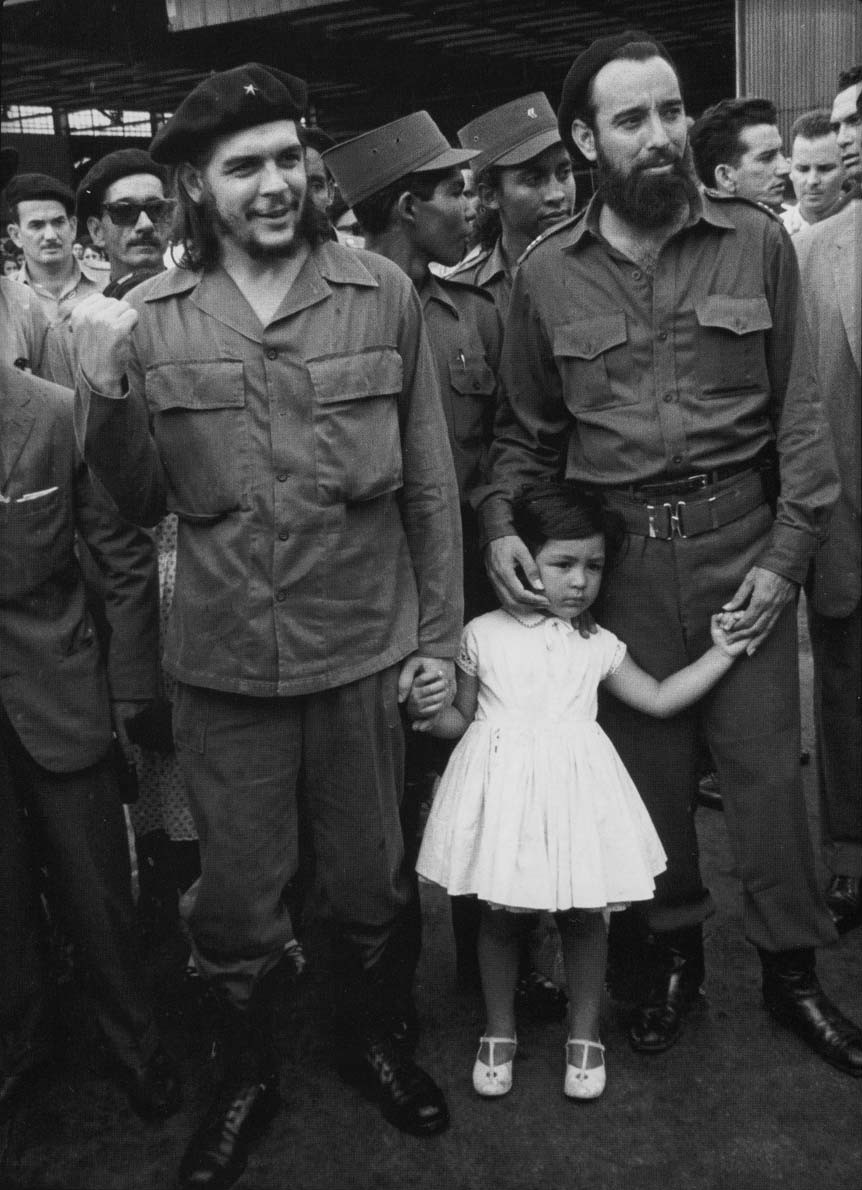
With Che Guevara and his daughter Hilda, 4 years old, in 1960.

In 1995, the Speleological Society of Cuba and the Cuban Society of Geography awarded Núñez the title of "fourth discoverer of Cuba", placing him at the height of men such as Christopher Columbus, Alexander von Humboldt and Fernando Ortiz, for his contribution in the field of underground Cuba.

Considered the father of Cuban speleology for his discovery in the 1950s the largest cave in the country, the Great Cavern of Santo Tomás. He participated in numerous scientific expeditions such as those to the North Pole, Antarctica, Easter Island, the Galapagos, and En Canoa del Amazonas al Caribe.

First president of the Cuban Academy of Sciences and founding president of the Speleological Federation of Latin America and the Caribbean and of various national and international scientific societies.

Núñez is internationally known for his scientific work in the field of geographical sciences, especially in speleology, one of his greatest passions, and in geohistorical issues of the most dissimilar regions of the planet. He also founded the Foundation of Nature and Man.

His studies contributed to preparing the theater of operations, where Column 8 "Ciro Redondo" would later arrive in 1958 in the Cuban Revolution, and there he was appointed Captain of the Rebel Army. Núñez participated in the liberation of Fomento, Cabaiguán, Placetas, Remedios, Caibarién and Santa Clara, under the command of Ernesto Che Guevara.

His literary work is extensive with more than 190 books and pamphlets and 1,665 articles, as well as documentaries, interviews, and others.

== Death ==
Núñez died in Havana on September 13, 1998. His work is highly respected in Cuban government circles.
