= List of massacres in Cuba =

The following is a list of massacres that have occurred in Cuba in chronological order:

== List ==
Name	Date	Location	Deaths	Perpetrators	Notes
Caonao Massacre	1513	Near modern-day Camagüey	100–3,000	Spanish Army, commanded by Panfilo de Narváez	
Year of the Lash	1844	Across the country	100+	Spanish Colonial authorities	
War of 1912 suppressions	1912	Across the country	3,000–6,000	Cuban National Army	
Jobabo Massacre	4 April 1917	Jobabo Sugar Mill	14	Cuban National Army, commanded by Captain Julio Cadenas	Most of those killed were Jamaicans, with at least one victim from the Bahamas.
Orfila Massacre	15 September 1947	Havana	6 (including 1 unborn child)	Cuban National Police	
Moncada massacre	July 1953	Moncada Barracks, Santiago de Cuba	52	Cuban National Army	Dozens of rebels were summarily executed following the Attack on the Moncada Barracks.
Assault on the Domingo Goicuría Barracks	29 April 1956	Matanzas, Matanzas Provice	15	Cuban National Army	
Haitian Embassy massacre	29 October 1956	Haitian Embassy, Havana	10	Cuban National Police	
Bloody Easter massacre	23–26 December 1956	Oriente Province	23	Cuban National Army	
Humboldt 7 massacre	20 April 1957	Havana	4	Cuban National Police, led by Esteban Ventura Novo	4 students who had participated in the Havana Presidential Palace attack and the seizure of the Radio Reloj station were summarily executed by Havana police.
Corynthia Expedition massacre	23–28 May 1957	Uvero	16	Cuban National Army	
Cabañas massacre	November–December 1958	Cabañas, Artemisa	12+	Cuban National Army	
San Juan Hill massacre	12 January 1959	Santiago de Cuba	71	Cuban Revolutionary Armed Forces	
Massacre of 30 August 1962	30 August 1962	San Carlos de La Cabaña Fortress	300–500	Cuban Revolutionary Armed Forces	
Río Canímar Massacre	6 July 1980	Canímar River	56	Cuban security forces	
Tarará Massacre	9 January 1992	Tarará, La Habana Province	4	Luis Miguel Almeida Perez and Rene Salmeron Mendoza	4 policeman were killed by a group of Cubans attempting to flee the island by stealing a boat.
Sinking of tugboat 13 de Marzo	13 July 1994	Off the coast of Cuba	41	Border Troops of the Republic of Cuba	41 drowned after a stolen tugboat attempting to seek asylum in the United States was sunk by the Cuban Coast Guard, who stated the sinking was unintentional.
