= Alberto Álvarez Díaz =

Cuban guerrilla

- Born: January 25, 1937; Havana, Cuba
- Died: 1958 (aged 20–21)
- Organization: 26th of July Movement

Alberto Álvarez Díaz (January 25, 1937 – 1958) was a Cuban guerrilla who participated in the Cuban Revolution. As a member of the 26th of July Movement, he later became the commander of the movement in the municipality of Regla, Havana. He was killed along with Clodomira Acosta and Lidia Doce, among other revolutionaries in the Juanelo neighborhood, San Miguel del Padrón.

== Revolution ==
Díaz studied in the public school No.7; he later studied in the Superior. Nevertheless, he was forced to leave his studies to start working at a shoe factory in Guanabacoa to continue his living. His first revolutionary action was at the Havana School of Commerce, where he was commanding a group of guerrillas of the July 26 Movement, of which he later became a leader in his town. He was arrested at the age of 21 in Juanelo, where he was later killed along with Reynaldo Cruz Romeu, Onelio Dampiel Rodríguez, Leonardo Valdés Suárez, Lidia Doce and Clodomira Acosta.
