= Clodomira Acosta =

Cuban revolutionary (1936–1958)

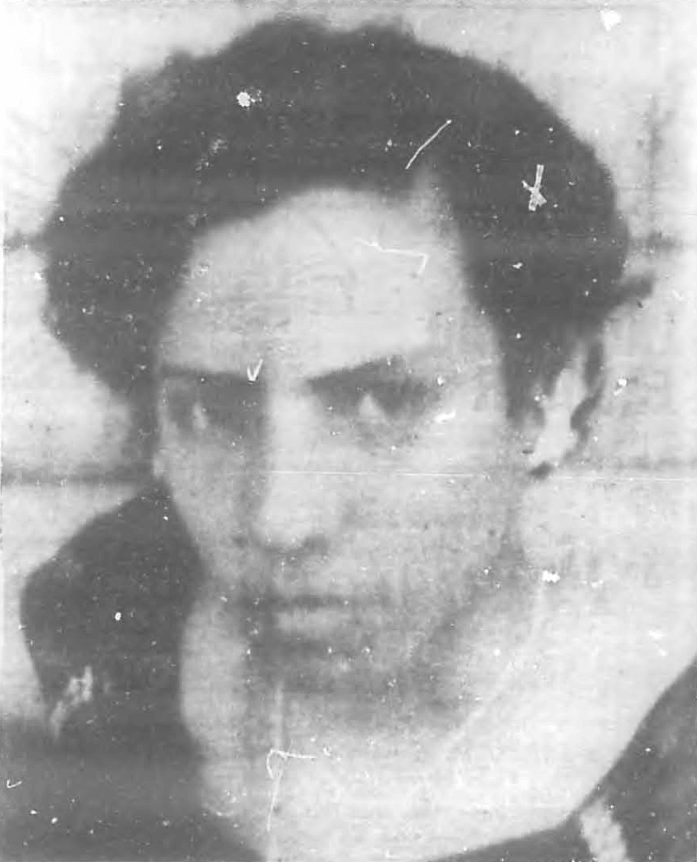
- Born: Clodomira Acosta Ferrales (Note: In a 1970 edition of Bohemia magazine, Acosta is also referred to as "Edelmira", and her surname is written as "Ferrals".); 1 February 1936; Oriente, Cuba
- Died: 17 September 1958 (aged 22); Cuba
- Cause of death: Extrajudicial killing
- Other name: Clodo
- Occupations: Revolutionary; Courier
- Organization: 26th of July Movement

Clodomira Acosta Ferrales (1 February 1936 – 17 September 1958) was a Cuban revolutionary who joined the 26th of July Movement as a courier, carrying messages to and from the guerrillas in the mountains of the Sierra Maestra. She came from a rural peasant background and was illiterate. During her time in the rebel army, she managed to escape capture several times. Her abilities as a messenger earned her the admiration of Fidel Castro, who sent her to gather intelligence for him. She often worked alongside fellow courier, Lidia Doce.

On 12 September 1958, Acosta and Doce were arrested. They were tortured and killed by police under the command of Esteban Ventura, and their bodies were dumped into the sea. Acosta and Doce have been memorialized as martyrs of the Cuban Revolution and honored by Castro and the Federation of Cuban Women.

== Early life ==
Clodomira Acosta was born on 1 February 1936, in a rural community in the Oriente province of Cuba. She was Afro-Cuban and mixed race. Her family was poor and worked on a citrus farm along the Río Yara. She was one of eight children. There were no schools in her area, so Acosta grew up without an education and was illiterate. When Acosta was nine years old, she worked as a domestic servant in the city.

== 26th of July Movement ==
By the time Acosta was 20 years old, the Cuban Revolution had been underway for several years, with rebel groups forming as part of an emergent movement to overthrow the dictatorship of Fulgencio Batista. She decided to join one such rebel group in her area after witnessing the brutality of the Cuban Rural Guard. During one of her missions, she was captured and interrogated by the authorities. They shaved her head and locked her in a room. She escaped by setting a fire and using the smoke and ensuing chaos to leap through a window without being noticed. Acosta fled through several towns until she reached La Vega de la Yua and joined another rebel group. In January 1958, after she was arrested and escaped a second time, she joined Fidel Castro's rebels—the 26th of July Movement—in the Sierra Maestra as a courier. At this point, Castro was already aware of Acosta's exploits and her ability to escape capture.

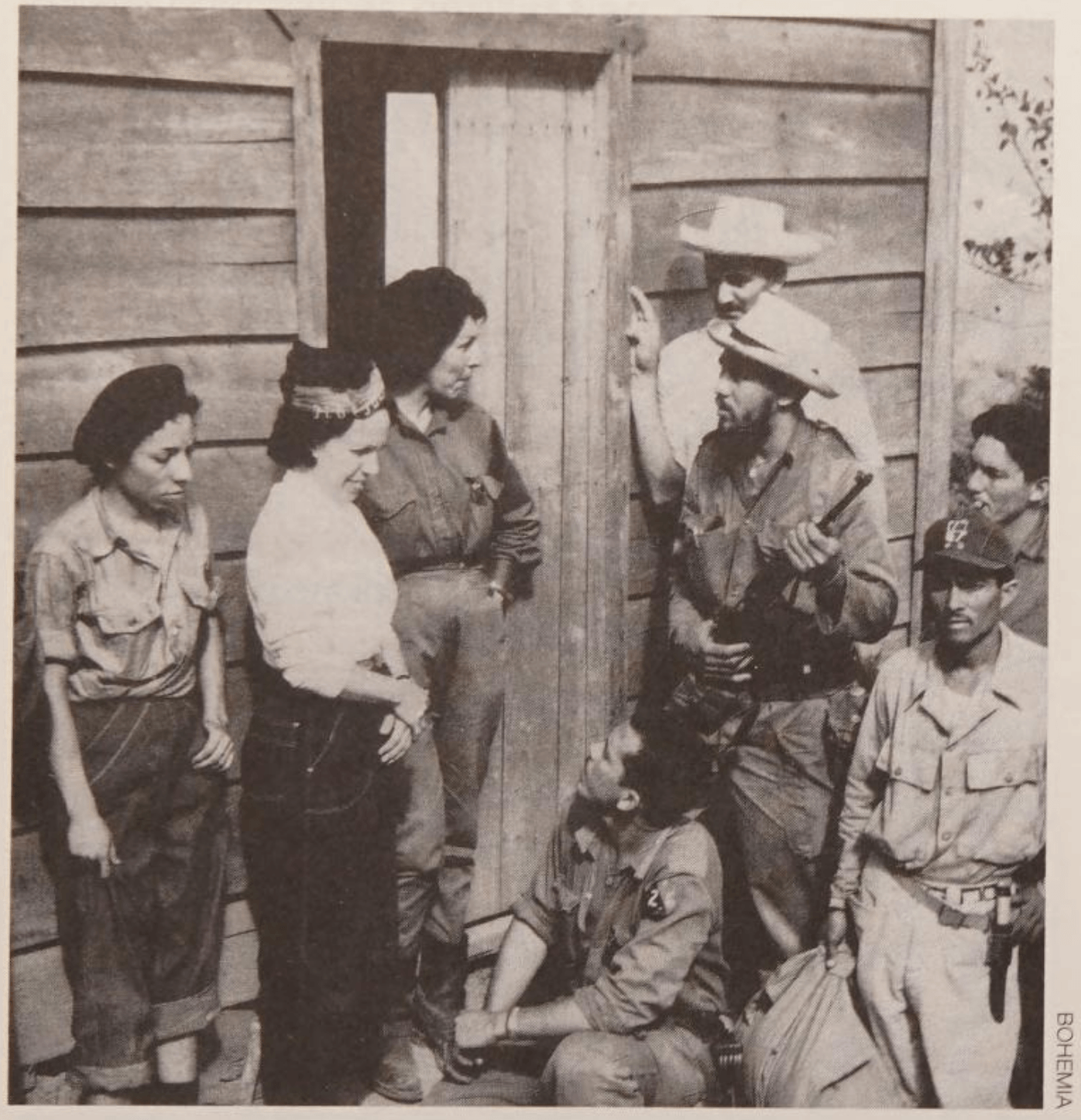
(From left to right) Clodomira Acosta, Pilar Fernández, and Celia Sánchez with a group of unidentified combatants in the Sierra Maestra in early 1958

Acosta was skilled at memorizing messages and was assigned "highly sensitive missions" by Castro. For one such mission in February 1958, she successfully established communication with the Directorio Revolucionario (DR) rebel group in the Escambray Mountains and questioned Faure Chomón, one of the leaders. She gathered intelligence to help Castro's forces better understand the DR, its members, and its revolutionary goals. A couple days after her arrival, she was separated from Chomón's group after Batista's forces ambushed them. She traversed the mountainside alone and found her way to a different section of the DR, where she met and questioned Ramón Pando Ferrer. Ultimately, she returned to the Sierra Maestra and passed this information on to Castro.

In April 1958, Castro called upon Acosta to deliver an urgent message to the llano, the urban underground wing of the revolutionary forces. The roads were blocked, so she approached a roadblock and pretended that she needed to pass so she could reach her "gravely ill mother". Her story worked, and the guards let her continue. In other instances, she would travel with her friend's daughter and hide messages inside the girl's doll.

Acosta worked closely with another courier named Lidia Doce. Che Guevara wrote "Lidia y Clodomira ya se habían hecho inseparables compañeras de peligro" (transl. Lidia and Clodomira had become inseparable companions in danger). She also worked with revolutionary Celia Sánchez, who referred to her by the nickname "Clodo". After discovering that she was illiterate, Sánchez offered to help her attend a school, but she refused. Still, Acosta carried a notebook with her and would often climb a tree to sit and write in it. According to Sánchez, the pages were filled with scribbles.

Castro planned to promote her to a leadership position in the Mariana women's platoon. According to one member of the platoon, Acosta was qualified "based upon her merits, her experience, and her trustworthiness", and Castro told her to prepare for her new position when she returned from a mission to Havana in September 1958.

== Capture and death ==
While on her final mission in Havana, Acosta and Doce stayed with four other revolutionaries at an apartment in the Juanelo neighborhood of San Miguel del Padrón. In the early hours of 12 September 1958, Batista's forces stormed the apartment and shot their comrades. Acosta and Doce were "badly beaten" and arrested by police under the command of the police chief, Esteban Ventura. Ventura had previously been indicted for torturing and murdering prisoners; historian Julia E. Sweig described him as "notoriously sadistic".

The details of Acosta and Doce's torture and extrajudicial killing come from the testimony of one of Ventura's subordinates, Carratala, who gave a confession from his prison cell in La Cabaña, where he was facing charges from the new revolutionary Cuban government following the rebel victory in Havana in January 1959. Acosta fought against her captors, biting one of them and leaving marks on his shoulder. Carratala described how the two women were put in bags filled with sand and repeatedly lowered into the sea. Doce died after she was submerged three times, whereas Acosta survived longer and, according to Carratala, was given a "coup de grâce". Their bodies were left to sink into the sea. Later, one of the combatants captured during the Bay of Pigs corroborated this account.

Although 17 September is historically considered to be the day they died, at least one source says that they could have died as early as 13 September. In the years following their deaths, Celia Sánchez tried to collect evidence to better understand what happened to the two women. A Cuban pamphlet about Doce, published in 1974, stated that the circumstances of the women's deaths were uncertain; the pamphlet's authors avoided quoting prisoners or policemen, such as Carratala.

== Legacy ==
Acosta and Doce have been memorialized as martyrs and national heroes of the Cuban Revolution. At the founding of the Federation of Cuban Women on 23 August 1960, Castro honored both women, saying Acosta was "humilde, de una inteligencia natural grande y de una valentía a toda prueba" (transl. humble, with great natural intelligence and unwavering courage).

The building in Regla, Cuba, which Batista's police raided on 12 September 1958, was converted into a historic site containing exhibits dedicated to Acosta, Doce, and the rebels who were killed that day.

== See also ==
- Alberto Álvarez Díaz, one of the revolutionaries killed when Acosta was captured on 12 September 1958.
