= Lidia Doce =

Cuban revolutionary (1916–1958)

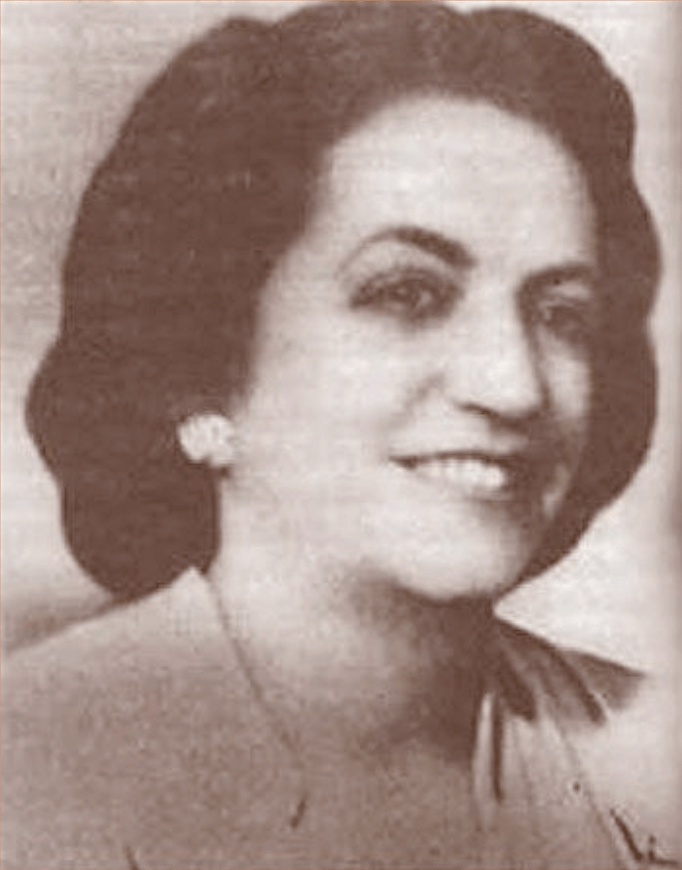
- Born: Lidia Esther Doce Sánchez; 27 August 1916; Oriente, Cuba
- Died: 17 September 1958 (aged 42); Cuba
- Cause of death: Extrajudicial killing
- Occupations: Revolutionary; Courier
- Organization: July 26 Movement

Lidia Esther Doce Sánchez (27 August 1916 – 17 September 1958) was a Cuban revolutionary and courier. She worked with fellow courier Clodomira Acosta, and she carried messages for Che Guevara.

On 12 September 1958, she was arrested with Acosta while on a mission in Havana. Both women were tortured and killed, and their bodies were dumped into the sea. In the decades since their deaths, Doce and Acosta have been memorialized as martyrs of the Cuban Revolution.

== Before joining the revolution ==
Doce was born on 27 August 1916 in the Oriente province of Cuba. She had three children; they were grown by the time she divorced her husband in 1956. After her divorce, she moved to Havana to work as a domestic servant, but she quickly returned to the Oriente when she heard a rumor that her son had been killed in the revolution. Although he turned out to be safe, she decided to stay in the area anyway.

== 26th of July Movement ==
Doce's first contributions to the revolution were sewing clothes and transporting supplies to guerrillas in the mountains. Eventually, she started carrying their messages and working directly with Che Guevara. He assigned her to lead a camp called "le Cueva" (transl. the cave). Guevara later shared that Doce engendered both "admiration and resentment" from the men, with one of them saying to him, "that woman has bigger [balls] than Maceo but she's going to get us all killed" (brackets in source).

She worked closely with another courier named Clodomira Acosta.

== Capture and death ==
While on a mission in Havana, Doce and Acosta stayed with four other revolutionaries at an apartment in the Juanelo neighborhood of San Miguel del Padrón. In the early hours of 12 September 1958, Batista's forces stormed the apartment and shot their comrades. Doce and Acosta were taken by police, who were under the command of the police chief, Esteban Ventura.

The details of Doce and Acosta's torture and extrajudicial killing come from the testimony of one of Ventura's subordinates, Carratala, who gave a confession from his prison cell in La Cabaña, where he was facing charges from the new revolutionary Cuban government following the rebel victory in Havana in January 1959. Carratala described how the two women were put in bags filled with sand and repeatedly lowered into the sea until they died. Doce died after she was submerged three times, whereas Acosta survived longer and, according to Carratala, was given a "coup de grâce". Their bodies were left to sink into the sea. Later, a combatant captured during the Bay of Pigs corroborated this account. Although 17 September is historically considered to be the day they died, at least one source says that they could have died as early as 13 September.

== Legacy ==
Doce and Acosta have been memorialized as martyrs and national heroes of the Cuban Revolution. At the founding of the Federation of Cuban Women on 23 August 1960, Fidel Castro honored both women, calling them "mujeres heroicas" (transl. "heroic women").

Guevara wrote that Doce was a "revolucionaria sin tacha" (transl. flawless revolutionary), and he recalled how she bravely dedicated herself to the revolution and carried his messages on many missions, despite the incredible risk. He also shared that she promised to get him a puppy, because she knew he loved them. This was before her final mission to Havana, from which she never returned. Guevara concluded: "personalmente, para mi, Lidia ocupa un lugar de preferencia" (transl. personally, for me, Lidia holds a special place).

The building in Regla, Cuba, which Batista's police raided on 12 September 1958, was converted into a historic site containing exhibits dedicated to Doce, Acosta, and the rebels who were killed that day.
