= Diezmero =

Coordinates: 23°05′N 82°19′W

- Ward
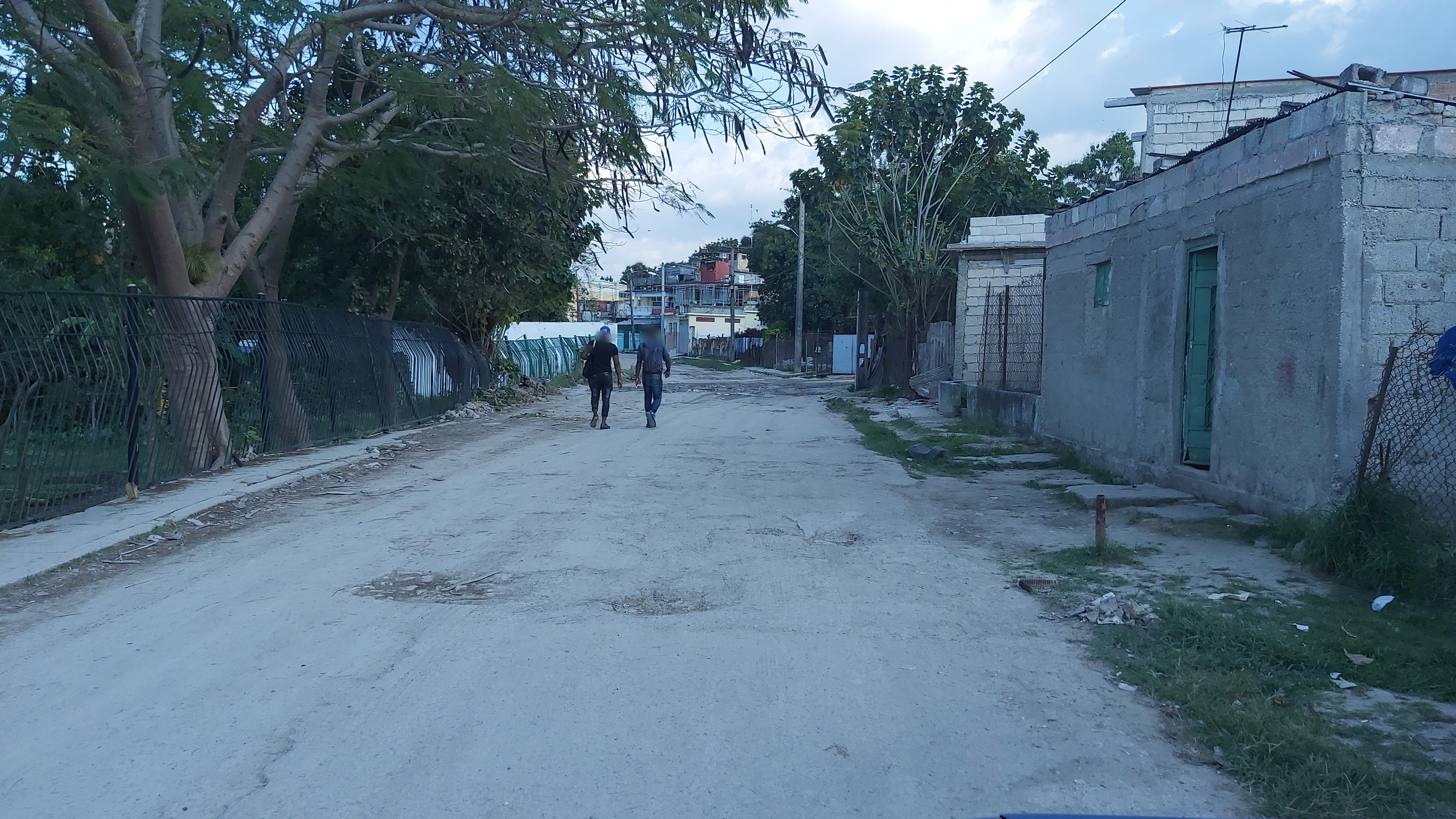
- Street of Diezmero

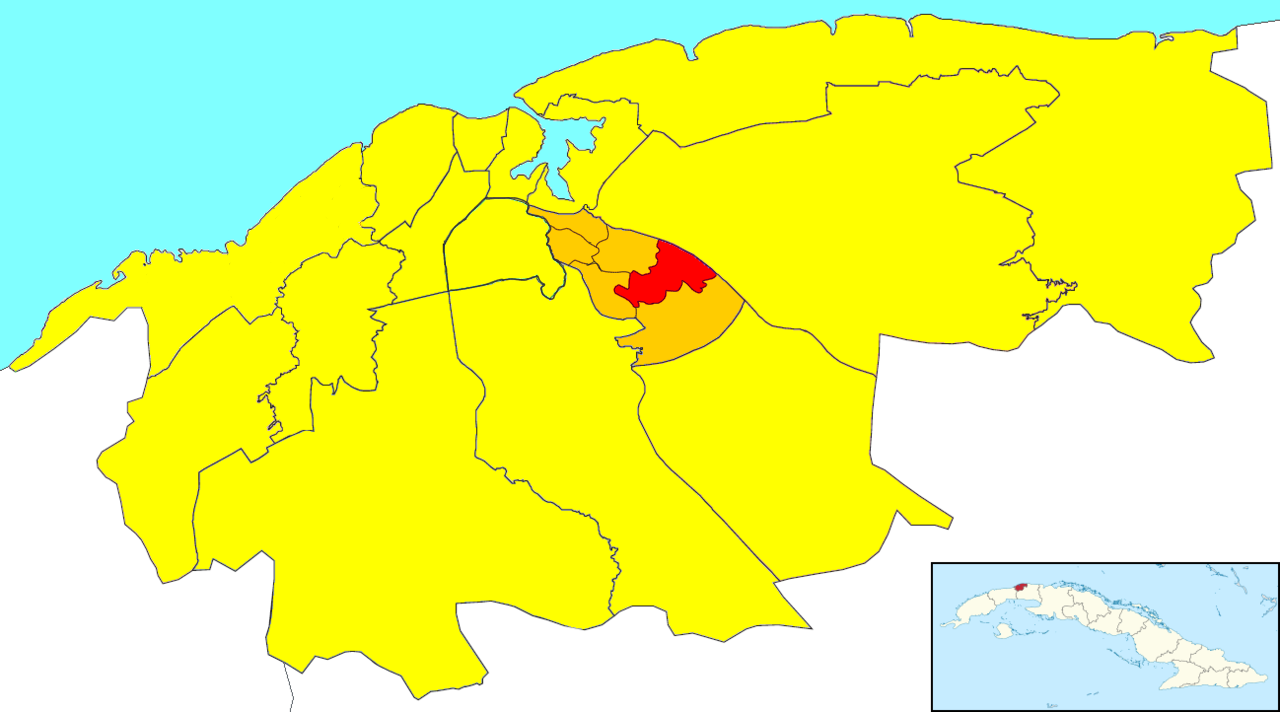
- Country: Cuba
- Province: La Habana
- Municipality: San Miguel del Padrón

Diezmero is a ward in the outskirts of Havana, Cuba, located by the Carretera Central. It is under the administration of San Miguel del Padrón, a city municipality of Havana. Its demography spreads within about 2 square kilometers.

== Notable residents ==
(B) denotes that the person was born there.

- Pedro Zamora (1972 - 1994), Cuban-American AIDS educator and television personality, known as a cast member on MTV's The Real World: San Francisco. Zamora also participated in the first same-sex commitment ceremony on American television when he exchanged vows with his partner, Sean Sasser, which is considered a landmark event in the medium. (B)
