= Museum of the Revolution (Cuba) =

Former presidential palace in Havana, Cuba; now a museum of the Cuban Revolution

- Museo de la Revolución
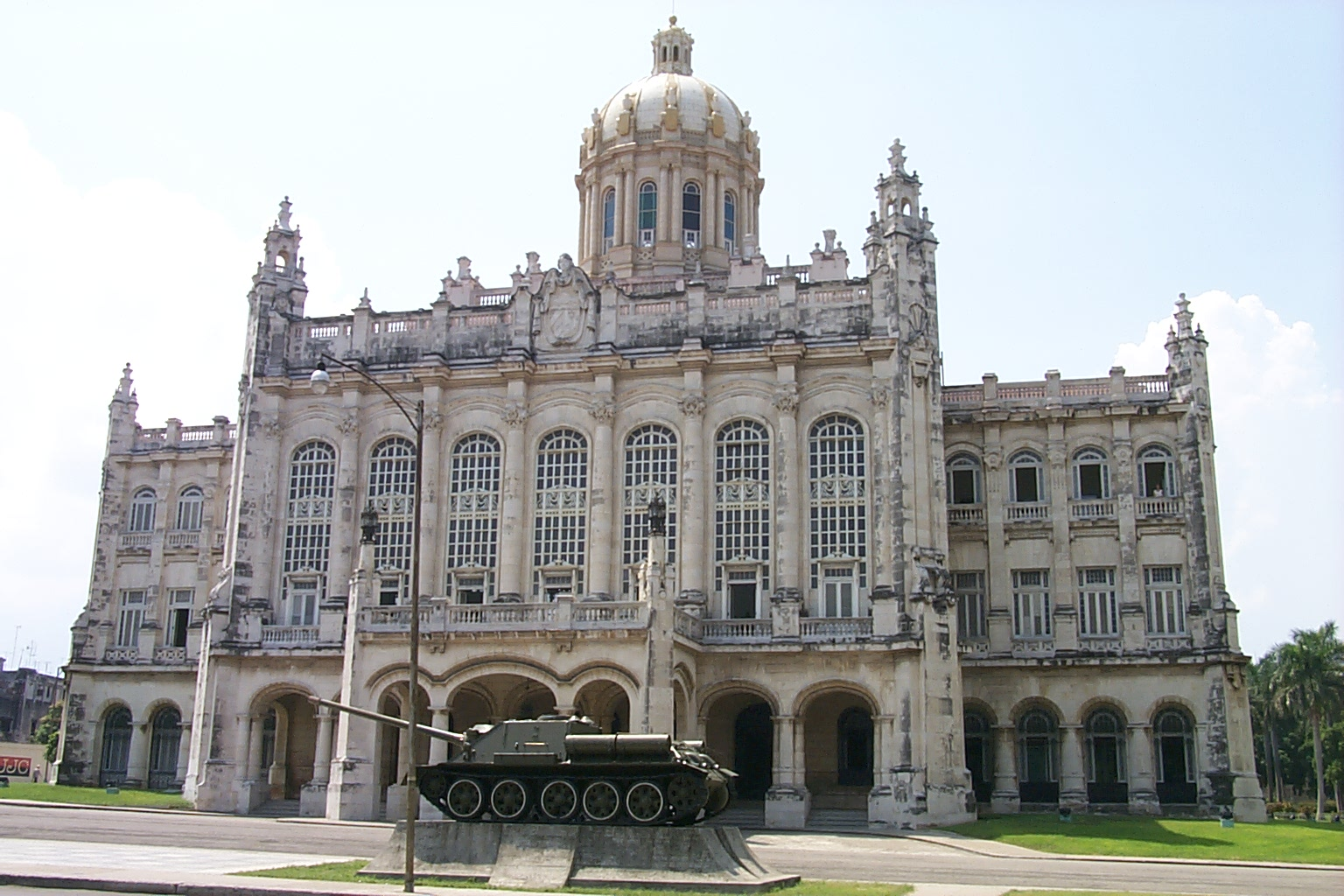
- Interactive map of the Museum of the Revolution area
- Former names: Palacio Presidential

General information
- Architectural style: Eclectic
- Location: Havana, Cuba
- Coordinates: 23°08′30″N 82°21′24″W
- Current tenants: Cuban military
- Inaugurated: 1920

Design and construction
- Architects: Rodolfo Maruri, Paul Belau

The Museum of the Revolution (Spanish: Museo de la Revolución) is located in the Old Havana section of Havana, Cuba, in what was the presidential palace of all Cuban presidents from Mario García Menocal to Fulgencio Batista. The building became the Museum of the Revolution during the years following the Cuban Revolution. The palace building was attacked by the Directorio Revolucionario 13 de Marzo in 1957.

== Building ==
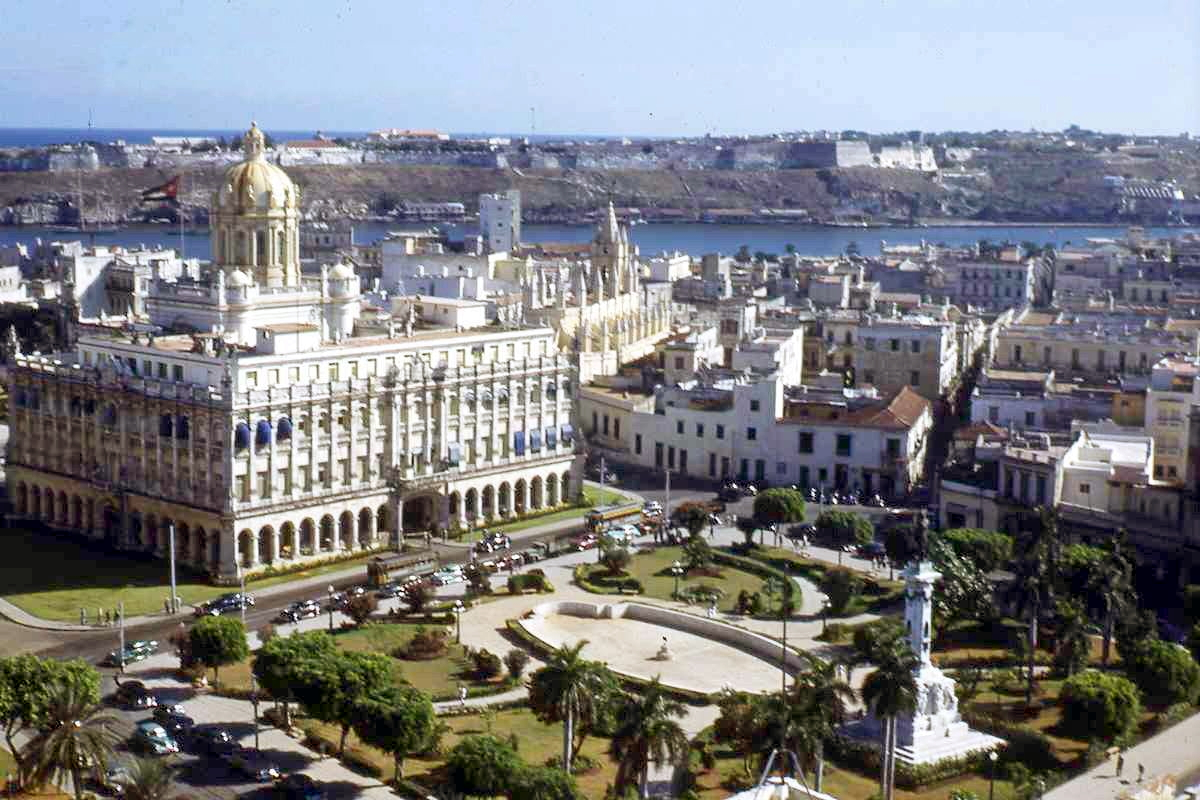
Presidential Palace-Parquey Alfredo Zayas

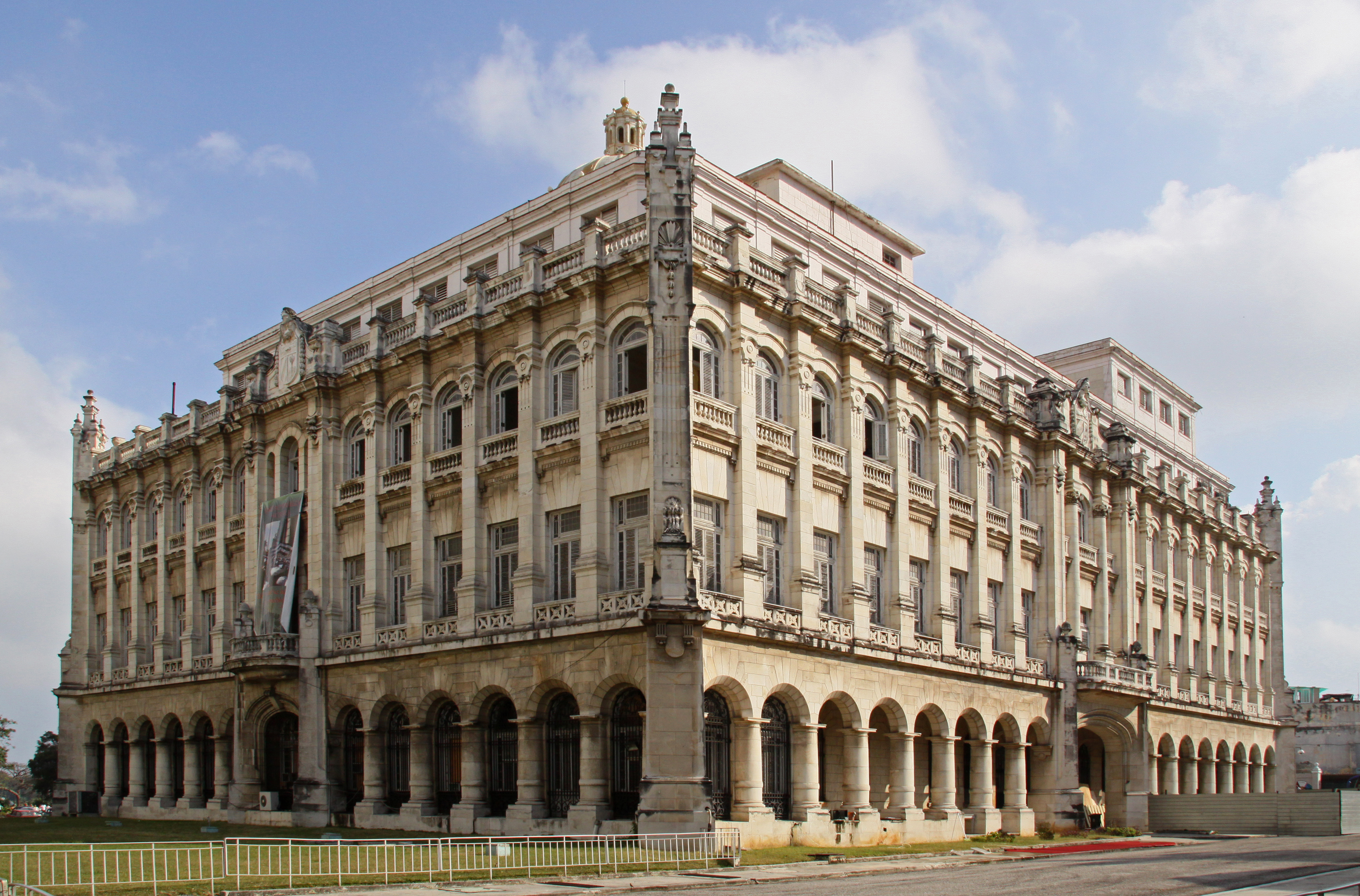
Former Presidential Palace designed by the architects Rodolfo Maruri and Paul Belau

The Presidential Palace was designed by the Cuban architect Rodolfo Maruri and the Belgian architect Paul Belau who also designed the Centro Gallego, presently the Gran Teatro de La Habana. The Presidential Palace was inaugurated in 1920 by President Mario García Menocal. It remained the Presidential Palace until the Cuban Revolution of 1959. The building has Neo-Classical elements and was decorated by Tiffany Studios of New York City.

The building was the site of an attack in March 1957 where the Directorio Revolucionario 13 de Marzo from the University of Havana attempted to kill Fulgencio Batista. It was a two-prong attack which included the take over of Radio Relox at the Radiocentro CMQ Building. Both attacks failed. According to one of the attackers, Faure Chomón of the Revolutionary Directorate, they were following the golpe arriba strategy and together with Menelao Mora Morales sought to overthrow the government by killing President Fulgencio Batista.

== Exhibits ==
The museum's Cuban history exhibits are largely devoted to the period of the revolutionary war of the 1950s and to the country's post-1959 history. Portions of the museum are also devoted to pre-revolutionary Cuba, including the 1895-1898 War of Independence waged against Spain, and an exhibit honoring American President Abraham Lincoln.

== Gallery ==
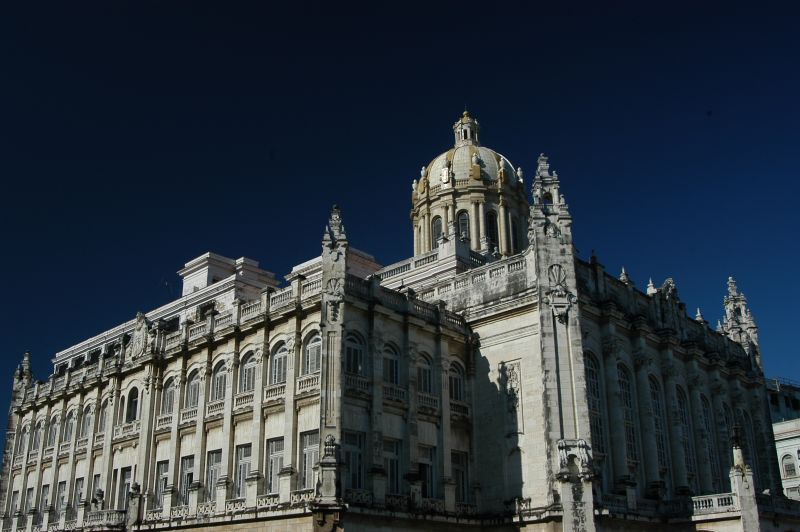

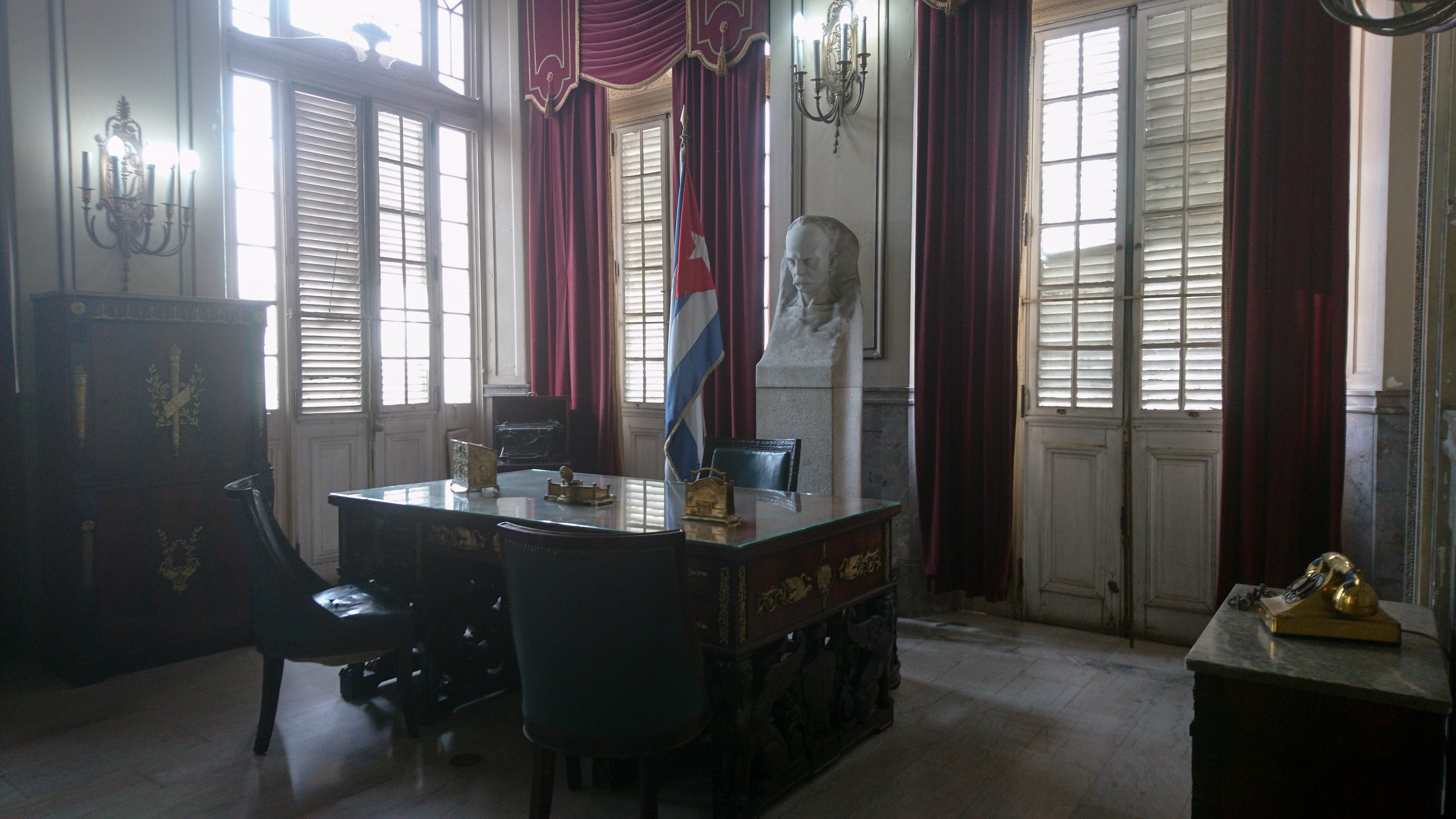

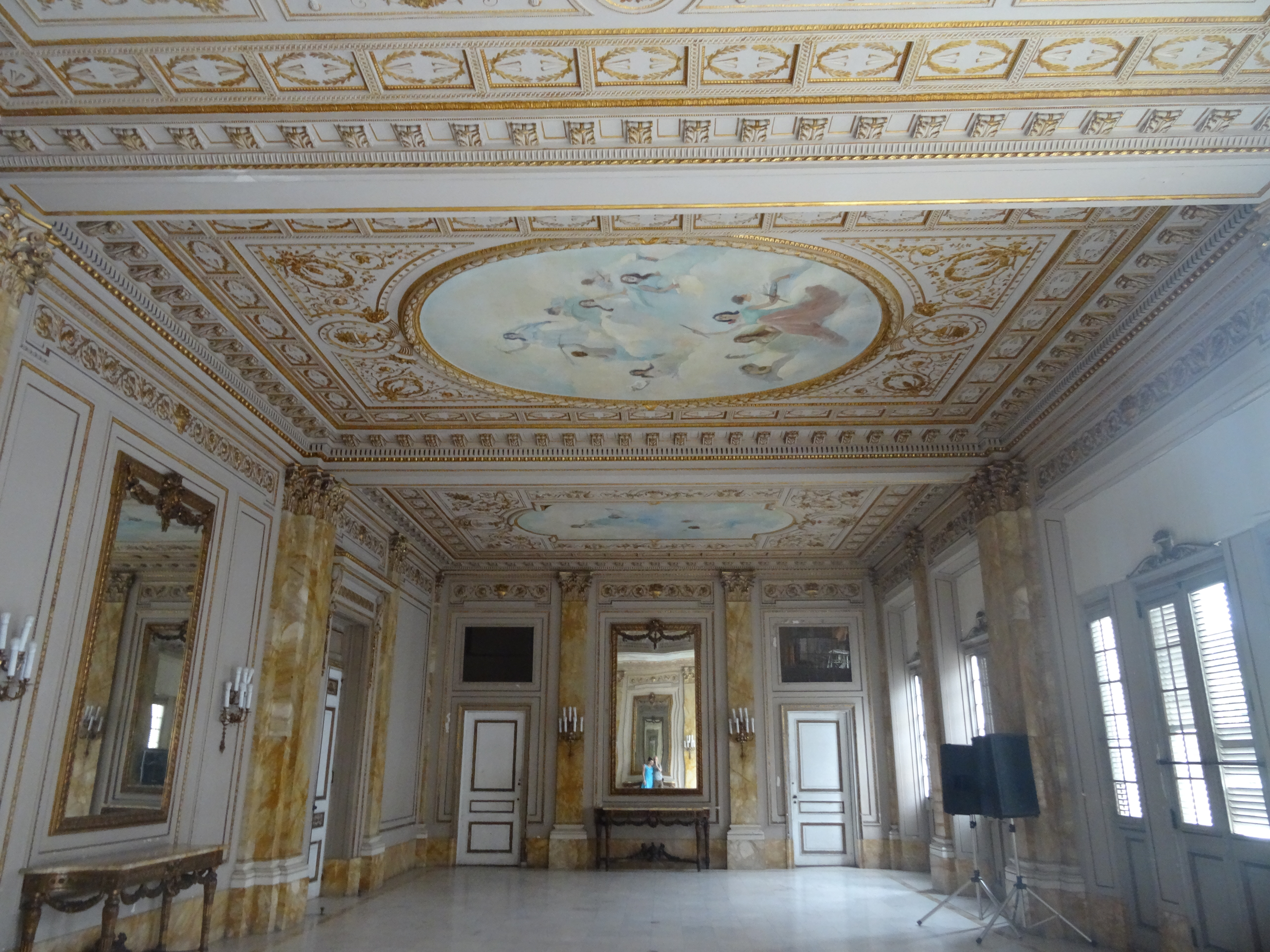

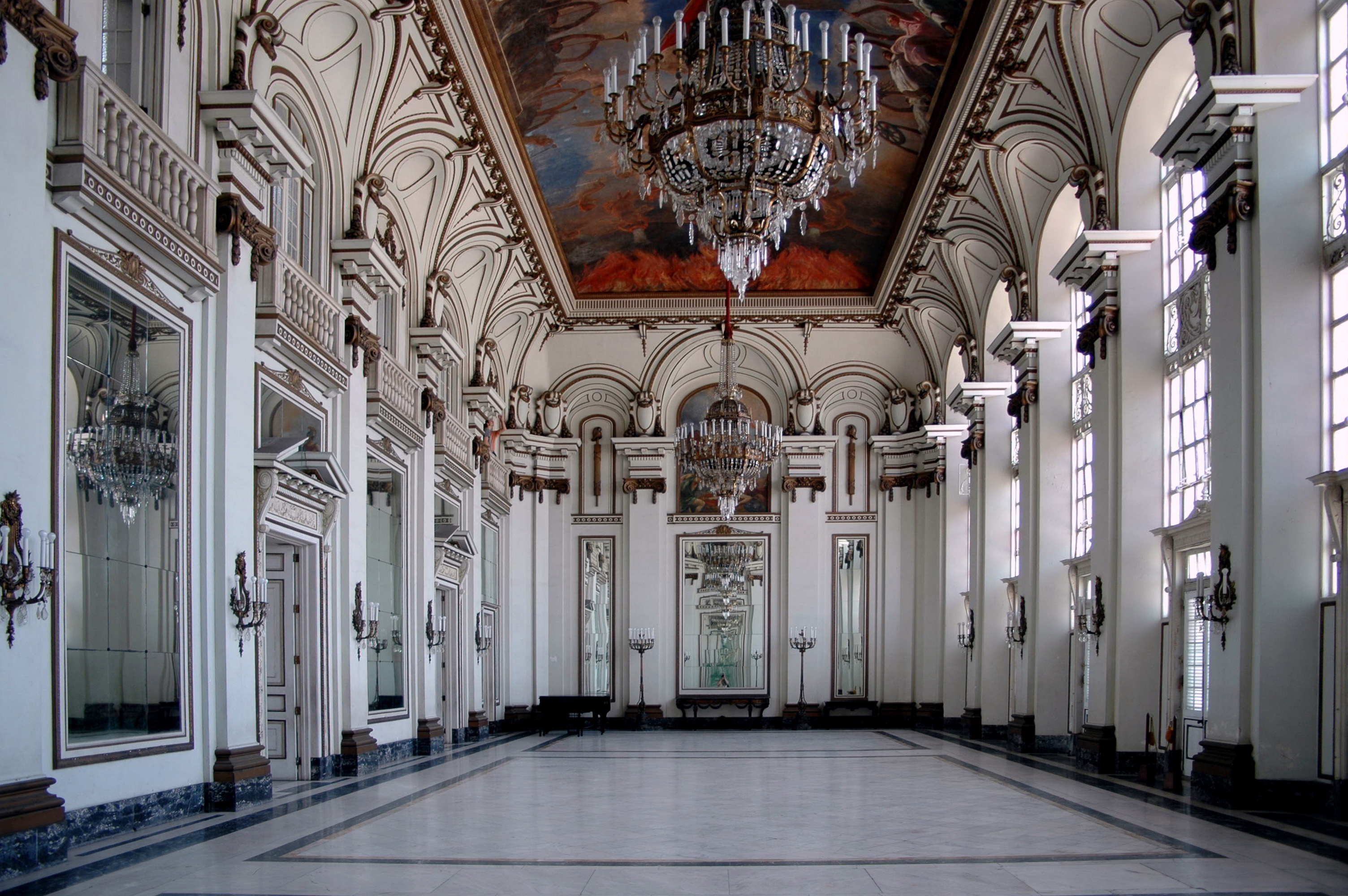

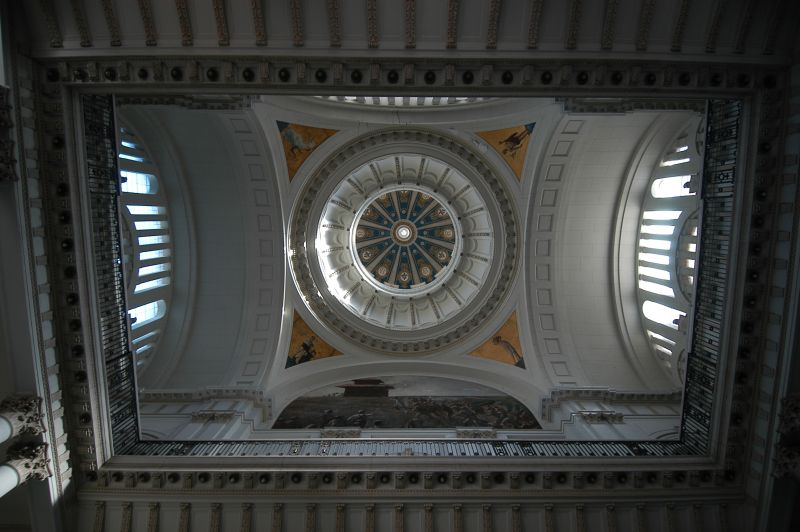

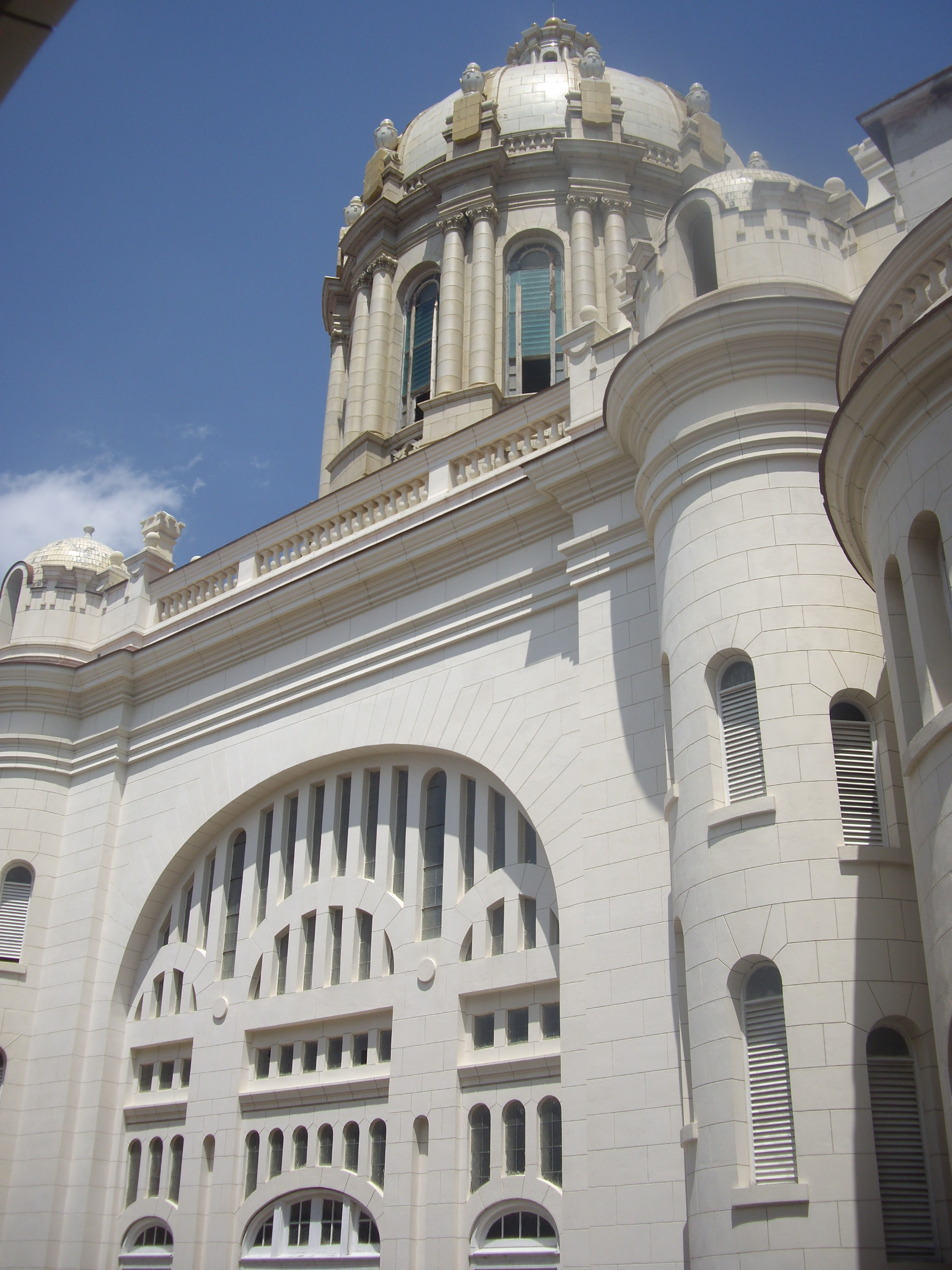

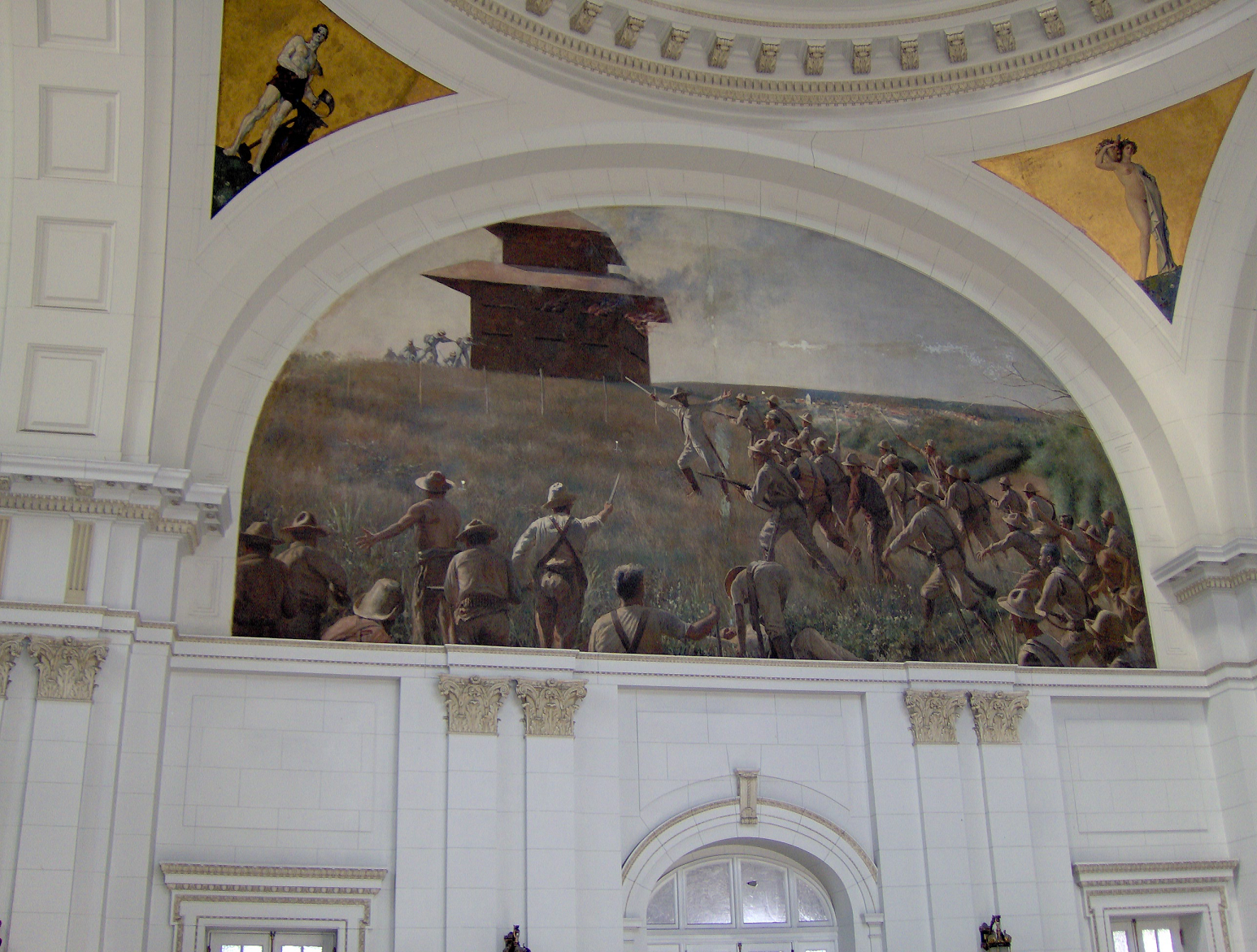

== See also ==
- Havana Presidential Palace attack (1957)
- Humboldt 7 massacre
- Radiocentro CMQ Building
- Directorio Revolucionario 13 de Marzo
- Faure Chomón
- José Antonio Echeverría
- Eloy Gutiérrez Menoyo
- Rolando Cubela Secades
