= Humboldt 7 massacre =

1957 extrajudicial killing of Cuban revolutionaries

- Part of the Cuban Revolution
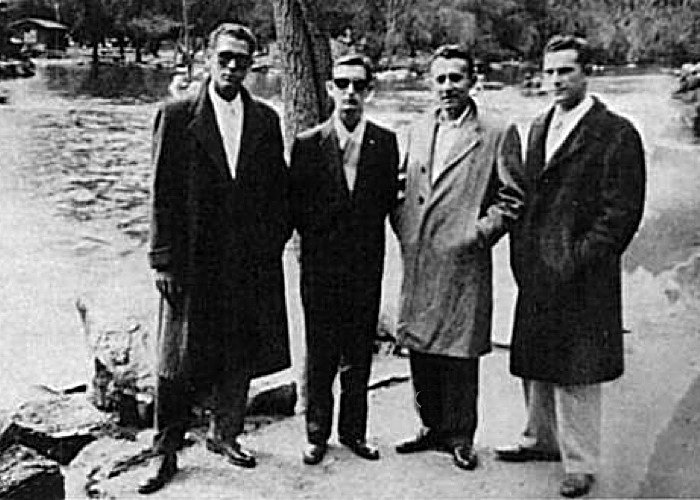
- (L to R) Fructuoso Rodriguez, Joe Westbrook, Faure Chomon, Juan Nuiry, Chapultepec Forest, Mexico City, October 1956.
- Date: 20 April 1957
- Location: Havana, Cuba; 23.142519°N 82.377759°W
- Caused by: Failed Havana Presidential Palace attack (1957), attempted seizure of Radio Reloj radio station. Betrayal by Marcos Rodríguez Alfonso
- Goals: To kill DRE revolutionaries (police)
- Methods: Surprise raid
- Result: Havana police victory

Parties
Directorio Revolucionario 13 de Marzo	Havana police

Lead figures
Fructuoso Rodríguez Pérez †; Juan Pedro Carbó †; José Machado Rodríguez †; Joe Westbrook Rosales †	Lt. Colonel Esteban Ventura Novo

Casualties
- Deaths: Fructuoso Rodríguez Pérez, Juan Pedro Carbó Serviá, José Machado Rodriguez, and Joe Westbrook

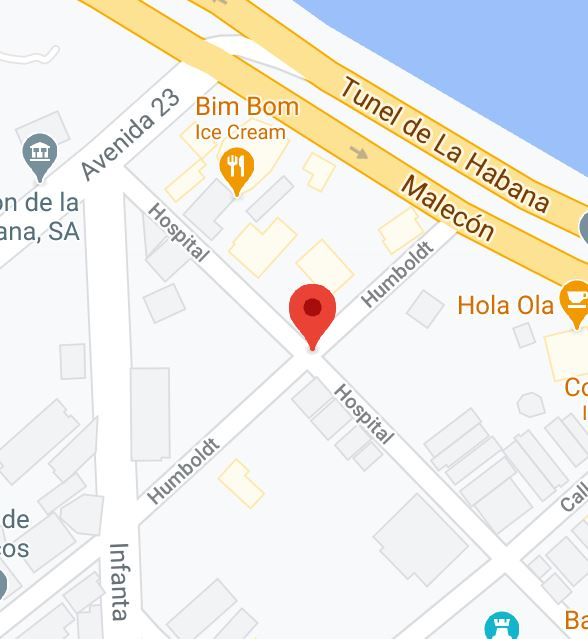
Humboldt 7 location.

The Humboldt 7 massacre was the extrajudicial killing of four armed Directorio Revolucionario (DR) members by the Havana police on 20 April 1957. The police, led by Lt. Colonel Esteban Ventura Novo, entered apartment 201 of Humboldt 7, a residential building, where the DRE members were hiding. The four men who were killed while resisting arrest had taken part in the Havana Presidential Palace attack and the seizure of the Radio Reloj station at the Radiocentro CMQ Building.

Prior to the incident at Humboldt 7, the Havana police were searching for the four men for their involvement in the attacks on the Presidential Palace and the Radiocentro CMQ Building. The men were alleged to have been betrayed by Marcos Rodríguez Alfonso (also known as "Marquitos"), a fellow revolutionary who was against the conflict to remove Fulgencio Batista from power. After an argument with members of the DR, he informed Lieutenant Colonel Esteban Ventura of their location; police promptly converged on the area and shot the men while they attempted to flee.

The incident was referred to as an assassination and a massacre after it occurred, and the event greatly reduced support for the police. The incident was covered up by police officials until a post-revolution investigation. Marquitos was arrested in 1961 and, after a double trial, he was sentenced by the Supreme Court to death by firing squad on 2 April 1964, and shot two days later.

== Background ==
The attacks on the Presidential Palace and Radio Reloj provoked a strong reprisal by the Havana police as they launched one of the worst waves of repression and violence across the city. Police squads, of their own initiative, went after opposition leaders who had not participated in the attacks, including Carlos Márquez Sterling, an attorney and professor of law and economics at the University of Havana, President of the Constitutional Convention, and signer of the 1940 Constitution of Cuba. One of the casualties was an attorney and former senator, Dr. Pelayo Cuervo Navarro, a figure in the opposition and leader of the Ortodoxo Party. Pelayo Cuervo was assassinated by the police the night of 13 March and is buried at the Colon Cemetery.

=== DR members hide ===
Eleven days after the assault on the Presidential Palace, on 24 March 1957, some of the surviving members of the Directorio Revolucionario Estudiantil met at the home of Andrés Silva on Calle L in el Vedado to discuss and analyze the recent actions of the attacks. Present were Fructuoso Rodríguez Pérez, Joe Westbrook Rosales, and Faure Chomón, among others.

The DR agreed to appoint Rodríguez as Secretary General of the Revolutionary Directorate and Juan Pedro Carbó Serviá and José Machado Rodríguez ("Machadito") to the executive board. It was further agreed that Chomón should go abroad to secure arms, and the other DRE members would remain in Havana.

A week later, the DR met in the same place from where the Radio Reloj assailants had departed for the attack on 13 March. According to the plans, those that attacked the Radio Reloj station would regroup at the University of Havana, with the aim of reinstalling the headquarters of the DR. When Rodríguez, Westbrook, Oliveras, and others arrived, they decided to place a .30 caliber machine gun at the steps of the university and in two strategic places within the campus. A short while later, Chomón arrived wounded, and reported on the failed assault on the Palace. It was decided that the militants would withdraw before Batista's superior forces surrounded the university.

The situation for the DR became increasingly difficult, as the police were raiding most of the houses and apartments they were using. On 9 or 10 April, Rodríguez relocated to el Vedado. There, Rodríguez saw his wife Marta Jiménez for the last time; she was in an advanced stage of pregnancy.

For several days, the group repeatedly moved to different safehouses, sometimes multiple times each day, to the point that they were using roughly one safehouse per day.

At dawn on 15 April, Machadito looked out the window of an apartment safehouse, observed that a patrol car was guarding the block, and immediately warned the others; however, nothing came of it. Seeing the patrol car again the next day, he believed the police would be moving in and alerted the others. However, it was a false alarm, and the police were not there.

The group continued to move from safehouse to safehouse. Feeling restless and paranoid, Machadito traveled by bus to make an asylum request with a journalist from El País; this failed, and the group continued moving, sheltering at the Pharmaceutical College on Malecón, where they stayed until the night of 19 April. Meanwhile, Westbrook secured apartment 201 of Humboldt 7, where the group went at midnight on 19 April.

On the morning of 20 April, Oliveras had arranged to drive Westbrook to Humboldt 7, but it took Oliveras longer than expected and Westbrook had his girlfriend to drive him there.

=== Marcos Rodríguez Alfonso's betrayal ===
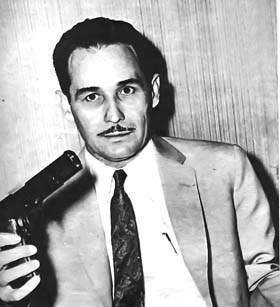
A photograph of Lt. Colonel Esteban Ventura Novo.

Marcos Rodríguez Alfonso ("Marquitos") was a revolutionary and member of the DRE. While Marquitos did not support Batista, he also did not support the use of violence to remove him from power, which put him at odds with the other members of the DRE. Marquitos reportedly betrayed the others over an argument at Humboldt 7, likely over the use of violence, and left the apartment after feeling Westbrook hurt his self-esteem. Marquitos contacted Lt. Colonel Esteban Ventura Novo of the police's Fifth Precinct in Havana. Lt. Colonel Ventura was known for reportedly being brutal and corrupt, having ordered the killings and torture of many revolutionaries, including several militants that participated in the attack on the Presidential Palace. Marquitos said he contacted Lt. Colonel Ventura due to his reputation as an "executioner".

== Incident ==
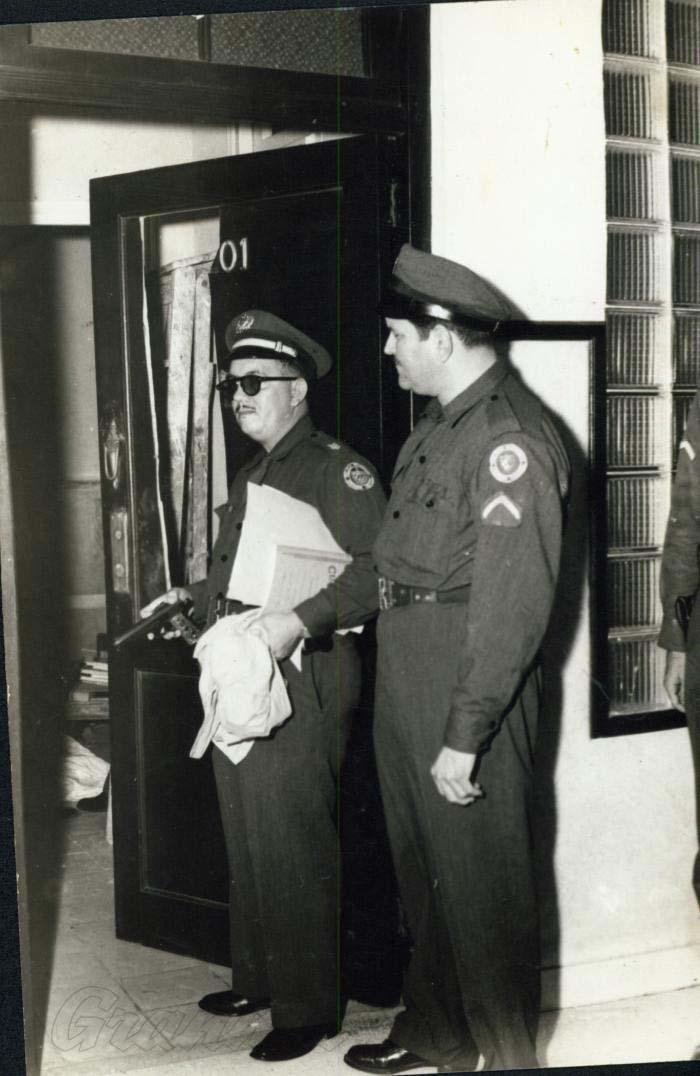
Havana police at the door of apartment 201. The policeman with the glasses appears to be Lt. Colonel Esteban Ventura Novo.

At approximately 5:50 PM, a squad of policemen, led by Lt. Colonel Ventura, surrounded Humboldt 7. They made their way to the door of apartment 201 and used the stocks of their guns to knock. (Note: There is some indication that the Communists set up the DR survivors to eliminate revolutionary competitors, and it has been noted that their two confederates (Faure Chaumon and Raúl Díaz Argüelles) left the hideout shortly before the police arrived. In 1964 Castro's revolutionary courts convicted Communist Marcos Rodríguez Alfonso, aka "Marquitos", of tipping off the police to the Humboldt hideout, and he was executed by a revolutionary firing squad.)

Realizing the police had found them, Westbrook hid in an apartment on the ground floor by pretending to be visiting a neighbor. When the police asked to enter the apartment, Westbrook reassured the neighbor and she opened the door. The police identified Westbrook and moved in; the neighbor asked the police not to hurt him, but they ignored her. Westbrook was a few feet down the hall when the police opened fire, killing Westbrook instantly.

The other revolutionaries left through a vent that led to apartment 101. Not knowing that they had been surrounded, they split up in different directions. The police shot and killed Carbó while he was attempting to board an elevator. Fructuoso and Machadito jumped out of a window into the downstairs hall. The window was too high, and Fructuoso was knocked out and Machadito broke his ankles when they hit the ground. While Machadito started getting up, the policemen opened fire, killing both.

It is unknown if the Havana police sustained any casualties during the raid, or if any civilians or bystanders were injured.

== Aftermath ==
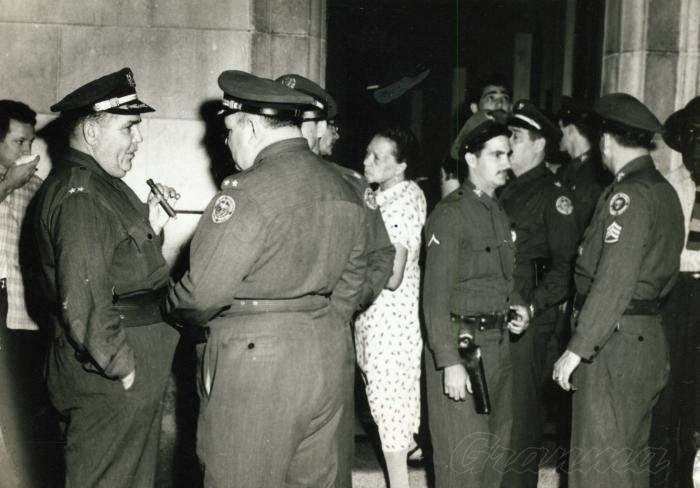
Havana policemen at Humboldt 7 after the shooting.

Three days after the event, Marquitos took refuge in the Brazilian embassy alongside other revolutionaries. Two months later, they left for Central America. After spending time in Costa Rica, Argentina, and Mexico, Marquitos returned to Cuba on 28 January 1959, later traveling to Czechoslovakia on a film scholarship. In Prague, he met the military delegation of Raúl Castro and accompanied them to France. He remained in Prague for two years; during this time, no attempts were made to return him to Cuba, as investigators were not sure if he was involved and thus did not suspect him. Marquitos received a message from the Brazilian ambassador in Cuba to go to another country and it was intercepted by Eastern Bloc intelligence services, who informed Osvaldo Sánchez and Commander Ramiro Valdés about Marquitos' location; by then, he was a suspect, as Marta Jiménez and others were insisting he was the informant. He was brought to Cuba, taken into custody, and charged with aiding the enemy. He was taken to Villa Marista, where he was interrogated for two-and-a-half years. With officials unable to obtain guilt for his betrayal in Humboldt 7, attention towards him relaxed. The Ministry of the Interior was required to make Marquitos confess or release him; however, the insistence of Jiménez and others prevented them from releasing him, as doing so would have made it appear that the government supported Marquitos. At the end of 1962, Marquitos' interrogations were headed by investigator Vicente Gutiérrez, a former Popular Socialist Party (PSP) member. Gutiérrez made his first conclusion: "If all of the occupants of apartment 201 were killed on the spot, who could have informed Ventura that Marcos escaped?"

Gutiérrez and the other investigators questioned Felipe Mirabal, the former second chief of the Batista Cuban secret police who was imprisoned in La Cabaña, but the resource did not work and he was returned to prison. However, while interrogating Marquitos, they pretended someone had indeed placed him at the meeting with Lt. Colonel Ventura. They told Marquitos to write about the most recent events in his life; when he did, he did not mention the argument the group had in the morning at Humboldt 7. During Marquitos' trial, Gutiérrez explained his discovery: "The lie was that when he recounted the visit to Humboldt's apartment, he pointed this out as a cordial visit in which he held friendly conversations with classmates. It does not reflect anything of the incident that occurred and for this reason this increases the suspicions, which are now irrefutable, that he is Humboldt's informer."

Lt. Colonel Ventura was eventually reassigned to the Ninth Precinct in Zapata. He fled Cuba after the revolution and moved to the United States, where he reportedly founded a private security company. The Cuban government repeatedly requested his extradition to try him for war crimes; the U.S. government refused. Lt. Colonel Ventura died of a heart attack in Miami, Florida on May 21, 2001, at the age of 87.

== See also ==
- Havana Presidential Palace attack (1957)
- Radiocentro CMQ Building
- Museum of the Revolution (Cuba)
- Directorio Revolucionario 13 de Marzo
- Faure Chomón
- José Antonio Echeverría
- Eloy Gutiérrez Menoyo
- Rolando Cubela Secades

== Bibliography ==
- Bonachea, Ramón L.; San Martin, Marta (2017) [First published 1974]. The Cuban Insurrection, 1952–1959. London and New York: Routledge. ISBN 978-0-87855-576-5. ISBN 978-1-138-53497-1.

== Additional reading ==
Attack on the Presidential Palace (13 March 1957)
