= Massacre of 30 August 1962 =

- Location: San Carlos de La Cabaña Fortress, Cuba
- Date: 30—31 August 1962
- Target: Members of the Anti-Communist Liberation Front
- Deaths: 300—500
- Perpetrator: Cuban Revolutionary Armed Forces

The massacre of August 30, 1962, was a series of mass executions carried out on August 30 and 31, 1962, at the San Carlos de La Cabaña Fortress in Cuba against members of a conspiracy seeking to overthrow Fidel Castro's government.

== Background ==
Former Rebel Army Captain Evelio Francisco Pérez Menéndez (Commander Frank), together with Jesús Faraldo, undertook the task of creating the Anti-Communist Liberation Front (FAL). Their goal was to coordinate efforts with members of the Cuban Revolutionary Armed Forces and underground organizations to seize Havana and other locations on the island and overthrow Fidel Castro's government. In the course of these activities, Frank made contact with members of the Navy and police, various regiments, and underground organizations such as the November 30 Movement, Revolutionary Unity, and the Montecristi Association (led by Ricardo Olmedo Moreno). Frank also established contact with the Revolutionary Recovery Movement through Héctor Fabian. Nationally known figures such as Rufo López Fresquet, Felipe Pazos, and Justo Carrillo Hernández also participated. The National Coordinator for the Labor Sector was Manuel Fernández Granda (Aníbal).

== Conspiracy ==
=== Preparations ===
Once the conspiracy was established, they selected August 30, 1962, at 7:00 p.m. in Havana as the date for the uprising. Civilians at strategic points were to block the entrances to the capital using cars and trucks to obstruct the entry of military transport, and the electrical power supply was to be cut off at 10:00 p.m.

Armbands bearing the Movement's name were manufactured and distributed to conspiracy members on the street for use on the day of the uprising. Juan Carlos Montes de Oca and Antonio Pons (Tony) manufactured Molotov cocktails and positioned explosives to blow up the Almendares Bridge and the Havana Tunnel. The uprising was set to begin at 9:00 p.m., triggered by the explosion of the Tallapiedra power plant and the blowing up of the Almendares Bridge and the Havana Tunnel. At that same time, the conspirators were to gather at the Fourth Police Station, which would serve as the uprising's headquarters.

According to Dr. Alberto Fibla, who served 25 years in prison for his role in the plot, the movement was democratic in nature. Men from all walks of Cuban life participated in the conspiracy. Conversely, supporters of Fidel Castro's government have alleged that the movement was part of Operation Mongoose.

Ventura Suárez Díaz was to be in charge of operations in the capital. The operation's military commander was Manuel Álvarez Margolles, a colonel and garrison commander from the Moncada Barracks regiment who had opposed the 1952 coup d'état in Cuba. The plan involved seizing police stations and small military outposts across the island and distributing weapons to anti-government civilians. The involvement of so many different organizations in the plot made it easier for State Security agencies to infiltrate the group. According to Hiram González, the conspirators ignored warnings regarding this risk.

Amidst these preparations, four members of the conspiracy—including national organizer Jesús Sierra Luoro—were arrested. All were released a few days later. Three of them contacted Tony to explain that they had been freed on the condition that they report on the organization's activities; Sierra had received the same ultimatum, accompanied by a warning that failure to cooperate would result in re-arrest and execution. Upon learning of the situation, Manuel Fernández Granda ("Aníbal") grew suspicious of Sierra for failing to report the incident. He subjected Sierra to intense interrogation, eventually extracting a tearful confession that he was collaborating with the G-2. Aníbal managed to convince him to provide false information to the Castroist agents in order to confuse them and buy the time needed to escape; however, the State Security apparatus had another infiltrator named Omar Fernández Rojas (known as "Pucho").

Fidel Castro's government had successfully infiltrated the organization, meaning it was fully aware of the operation. By the morning of August 30, 1962, the key leaders of the failed insurrection had already been arrested. In total, between 400 and 500 people were detained in connection with the conspiracy; the government held them incommunicado at the San Carlos de La Cabaña Fortress.

Unaware of the situation, Tony Pons tried unsuccessfully to contact Juan Carlos and other group leaders, so he headed to the Fourth Station as agreed. Upon arrival, he found it surrounded by an army contingent that included tanks and heavy weaponry. The uprising had failed. The collapse was devastating and dismantled all the participating organizations. Amidst the chaos, Tony Pons assumed military command and that of action, but without resources, there was little they could do. The need to acquire weapons forced them to steal two rifles; the G-2 intelligence agency suspected brothers Carlos and Juan Salabarría of involvement in the theft and attempted to arrest them at home, but the two young men managed to escape out the back during a moment of inattention. Sara Rodríguez, the conspirators' mother, was detained in an attempt to force her to reveal her sons' hiding place, but she committed suicide before she could confess.

== Executions ==
A summary trial was quickly held, with Omar Fernández Rojas ("Pucho") acting as one of the accusers. On 30 August, 75 people were executed by firing squad; in the days that followed, a total of 300 to 500 Cubans involved in the conspiracy were executed. Four firing squads operated simultaneously, each executing four people at a time. Many of those condemned shouted, "Long live Christ the King, Long live a Free Cuba, Death to Communism, Death to Fidel, Long live the Catholic Association." Those involved in the conspiracy were executed in other provinces as well as at the San Carlos de La Cabaña Fortress. Notable among the executed were the conspiracy's leaders—Colonel Margüelles and Captain Evelio Álvarez—as well as Juan Carlos Montes de Oca and even Jesús Sierra Luoro, after it was discovered he was a double agent.

The number of executions exceeded the number of those shot in the days surrounding the Bay of Pigs invasion. This case resulted in the highest number of executions and imprisonments in the history of the struggle against Fidel Castro's government, even though no material damage was caused and no one was injured. Those who were not executed served long prison sentences.

Evelio Francisco Pérez Menéndez was subsequently executed by firing squad on September 21 of that same year—a date ordered by Fidel Castro himself. Following the executions associated with the "August Case," there was a hiatus in the firing squad executions at the San Carlos de La Cabaña Fortress; they resumed on May 30, 1963. Ricardo Olmedo Moreno was pressured to appear on national television to help dissuade opponents of the regime, but he replied: "I am not a performer; I would prefer death to a television program." Moreno was executed by a firing squad on the night of May 30, 1963.
