= Esteban Ventura Novo =

Cuban law enforcement official (1913–2001)

Estaban Ventura Novo
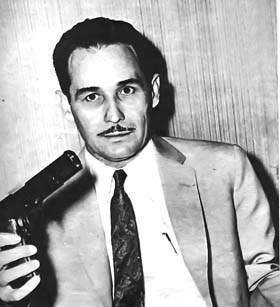
- Born: December 26, 1913; Pijirigua, Artemisa, Cuba
- Died: May 21, 2001 (aged 87); Miami, Florida, United States
- Spouse(s): Dr. Serafina Freyre; Niurka
- Children: 10
- Military career
- Allegiance: Republic of Cuba
- Branch: Cuban Constitutional Army
- Rank: Colonel
- Commands: Fifth Police Station (Quinta Estación)
- Known for: Humboldt 7 massacre
- Conflicts: Cuban Revolution

Esteban Ventura Novo (December 26, 1913 – May 21, 2001) was a controversial figure in Cuban history, known for his prominent role in law enforcement during Fulgencio Batista's dictatorship.

== Early life and career ==
Esteban Ventura Novo was born on December 26, 1913, in Pijirigua, Artemisa, Cuba. His parents were Timoteo M. Ventura Hernández and Domitila Novo Córdova, and he had several siblings. His early life was spent in the rural setting of Central Andorra, where he worked for some years before joining the military. In December 1933, Ventura enlisted in the Cuban Constitutional Army and was later transferred to the Guardia Rural. His police career began in 1947 when he joined the National Police, quickly rising through the ranks due to his involvement with influential political figures.

== Role in the Batista regime ==
Ventura's career peaked during Batista's dictatorship following the 1952 coup. By 1958, he had risen to the rank of lieutenant colonel in the Havana police force. He was known for his harsh tactics against those who opposed Batista's regime. Ventura's command at the Fifth Police Station (Quinta Estación) in Havana became notorious for reports of torture and extrajudicial killings. His enforcement methods were aimed at suppressing political dissent and maintaining Batista's control.

== Humboldt 7 incident ==
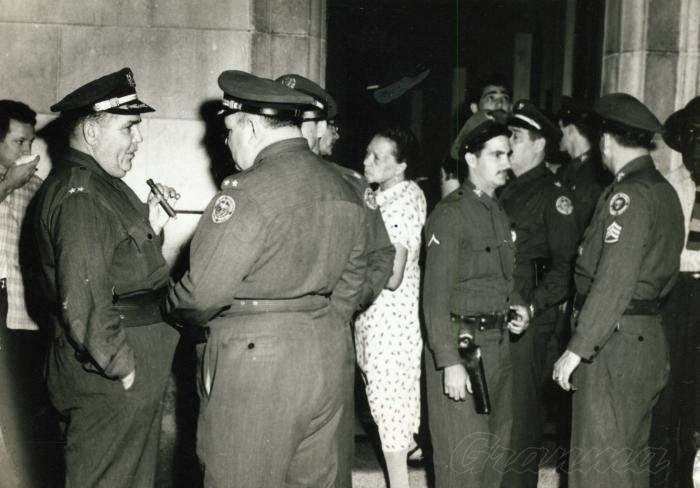
Havana police at Humboldt 7 massacre, April 20, 1957

One of the most infamous events associated with Ventura Novo was the Humboldt 7 incident in 1957. This event involved the murder of four Directorio Revolucionario (DR) member—Fructuoso Rodríguez, Juan Pedro Carbó Serviá, José Machado Rodríguez (Machadito), and Joe Westbrook—who were hiding in an apartment at 7 Humboldt Street in Havana. Ventura's Forces cornered the four armed men and brutally shot dead all four at close range. After the massacre the support for the police greatly reduced.

== Post-revolution and later years ==
After the Cuban Revolution in 1959, Ventura's home was vandalized by an angry mob, however he was able to flee via plane to the United States to escape retribution from the new government led by Fidel Castro. Novo's family remained in Cuba and John Martino was enlisted to exfiltrate them to the United States, however Martino was caught and sentenced to thirteen years for human smuggling.

He lived in Miami until his death in 2001. While in exile, Ventura continued to defend his actions, arguing that they were necessary to maintain order and combat communism. His legacy remains deeply divisive; some view him as a staunch anti-communist who fought to protect Cuba from a "totalitarian" regime". He founded the private security firm Preventive Security Service & Investigation, in Miami.
