= San Miguel del Padrón =

- Municipality of Havana
- San Miguel del Padrón
- Coat of arms

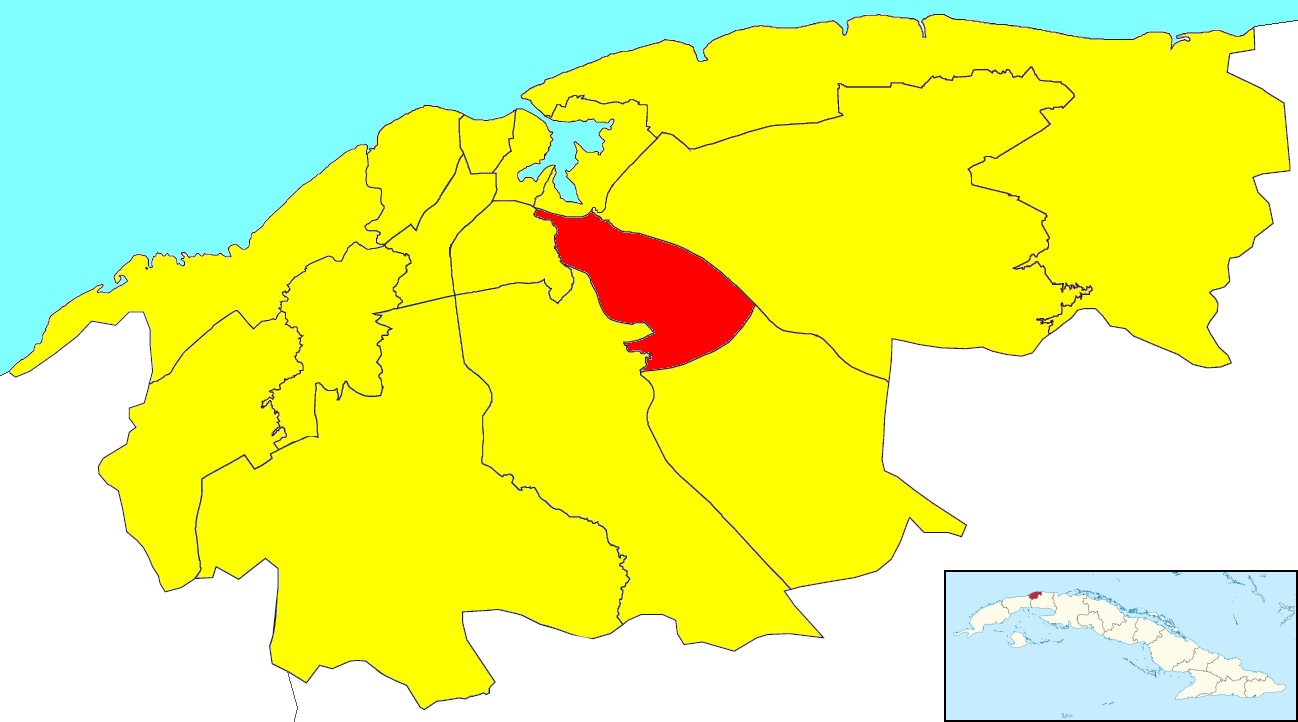
- Location of San Miguel del Padrón in Havana
- Coordinates: 23°05′47″N 82°19′36″W
- Country: Cuba
- Province: Ciudad de La Habana
- Wards (Consejos Populares): Diezmero, Dolores-Veracruz, Jacomino, Luyanó Moderno, Rocafort, San Francisco de Paula

Area
  - Total: 26 km^{2} (10 sq mi)
- Elevation: 50 m (160 ft)

Population (2022)
  - Total: 161,072
  - Density: 6,125.9/km^{2} (15,866/sq mi)
- Time zone: UTC-5 (EST)
- Area code: +53-7

San Miguel del Padrón is one of the 15 municipalities/boroughs (municipios in Spanish) into which the city of Havana, Cuba is divided. It is on Havana's south-eastern outskirts, stretching from Ciudad Mar to Diezmero and from Reparto Mañana to Caballo Blanco.

== Overview ==
This vast demographic area was unpopulated in the late 1940s, with small pockets of wealthy and land owners. It became heavily populated during the early 1960s with the emergence of Corea (name given to a stretch of terrain clandestinely occupied by the homeless after being evicted from the main city areas) and new houses along the main street (Calzada de San Miguel). By the mid 1960s the town became administratively adjacent to Guanabacoa.

San Miguel has been notorious for musicians, professional dancers and afro Cuban religious practitioners (Santería, Lukumi, Palo). During the early 1970s it was judicially declared one of the most troublesome towns in Havana due to a high degree of black market goods and comestibles.

Within San Miguel del Padron the municipality of Veracruz is home to a significant part of the town's population. The neighborhood consist mostly of old deteriorated apartment buildings predating 1970. The primary school is Heroes de Yaguajay, there is a baseball field and a farmers market. Electrical power and water are disconnected often in efforts to save for the Cuban revolution. Hunger and poverty is a way of life that the citizens have to become acclimated to.

== Demographics ==
In 2004, the municipality of San Miguel del Padrón had a population of 159,273. With a total area of 26 km^{2} (10 sq mi), it has a population density of 6,125.9/km^{2} (15,866/sq mi).

At present, residents extending out of a radius from Virgen del Camino, Martin Perez, Diezmero, San Francisco de Paula y Juanelo identify as Sanmiguelinos. Thus, making this geographic area a vastly populated region of Havana.

== See also ==
- Finca Vigía - Ernest Hemingway's Cuban home in San Francisco de Paula Ward
- List of cities in Cuba
- Municipalities of Cuba
