= Guantanamo Migrant Operations Center =

Migrant detention center operated by US

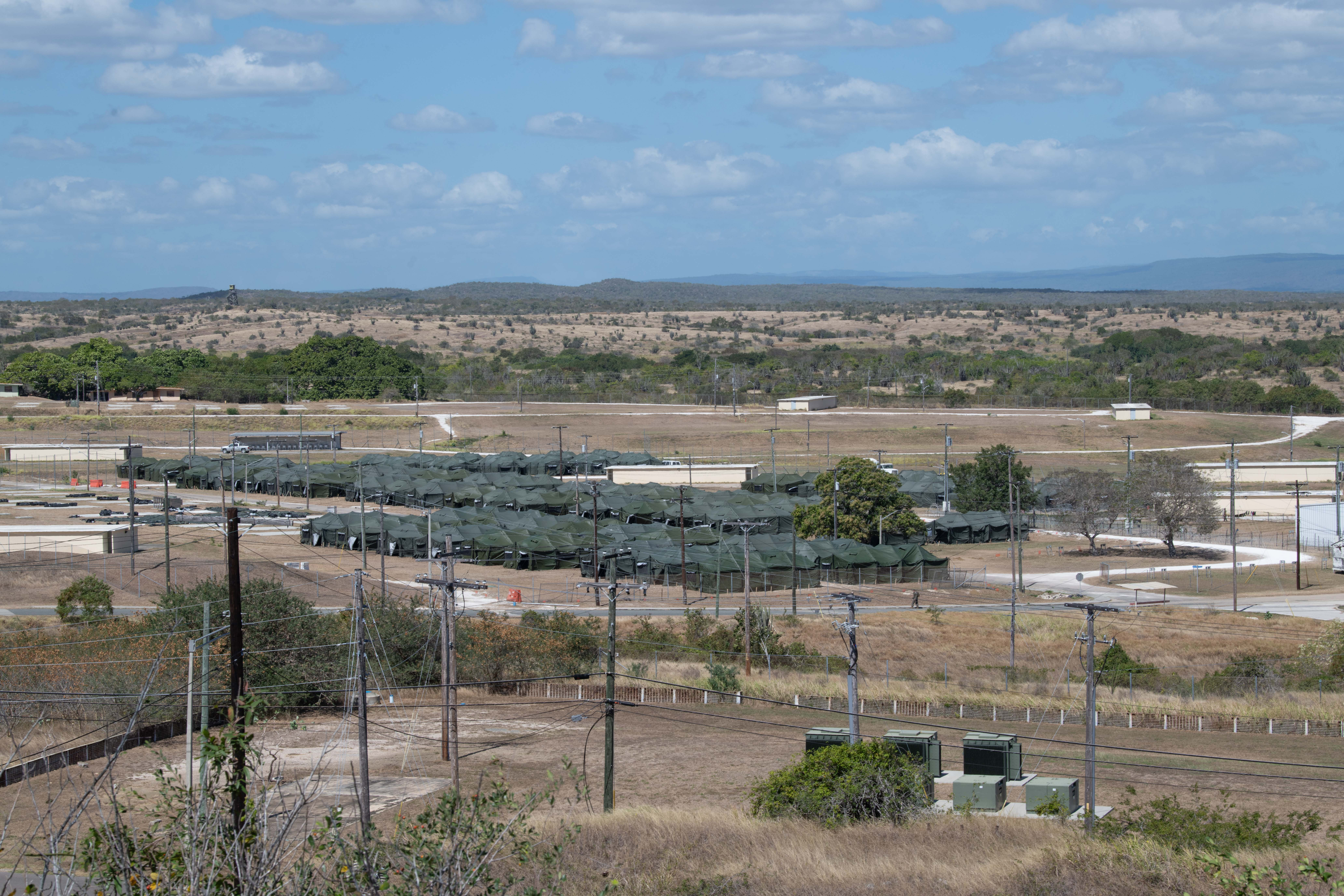
- A tent facility at the GMOC in February 2025

- Location within Cuba
- Location: Guantanamo Migrant Operations Center at Guantanamo Bay Naval Base, Cuba; 19°54′54″N 75°13′12″W
- Status: Operational
- Population: Unknown (July 25, 2026)
- Managed by: U.S. Immigration and Customs Enforcement and United States Navy

The Guantanamo Migrant Operations Center (GMOC) is a migrant detention facility at Guantanamo Bay detention camp within Naval Station Guantanamo Bay (NSGB), on the coast of Guantanamo Bay, Cuba.

The GMOC is a distinct facility from the detention blocks used to hold terrorism suspects and "illegal enemy combatants". In the past, the GMOC has usually held a small number of Haitian and Cuban migrants who were detained at sea but sometimes held larger numbers when those countries were in political turmoil, like during the Haitian refugee crisis or the 1994 Cuban rafter crisis. The detention of migrants at the GMOC has been previously criticized by human rights groups and been the subject of lawsuits.

The GMOC was the focus of an initiative announced on January 29, 2025, under President Trump to greatly expand the facility so it could hold 30,000 of the "worst of the worst" migrants, with some being held indefinitely. The expansion of the facility has been questioned on legal, logistical, and humanitarian grounds. While Trump's presidential memorandum specified that migrants would be held at the GMOC, some migrants have been brought to Guantanamo and held by military guards at Camp 6, a military prison previously used to hold al-Qaeda suspects.

Since the announcement of the expansion of the GMOC, various small groups detainees have been flown on and off the facility. In February 2025, 178 Venezuelan migrants were moved to Guantanamo Bay, with 127 being held at Camp 6 while the remaining 51 were held at GMOC. All but one of these migrants were reportedly deported back to Venezuela via Honduras, with the remaining migrant moved to another detention facility by February 20, 2025. As of March 14, 2025, all detained migrants had been moved off the base. Later more detainees including Nicaraguans had been shuttled to the base. The estimates were by the end of March that less than 400 detainees had been sent to the base at any time. The estimated costs of implementing Trump's executive order to expand the GMOC has been $40 million in the first month of operations.

== History ==
The GMOC has been used to hold migrants detained at sea for decades, including Haitian and Cuban refugees. While the facility has generally only been used to hold a small number of migrants, it has been expanded in the past in reaction to increased numbers of migrants being detained at sea.

=== Early history ===
Because of its unique location, in the 1970s while many Haitians attempting to flee Haiti would sail directly to the United States, others would sail to Guantanamo. According to legal scholar Jeffrey S. Kahn:

For many of the Haitian captains, the coast of Cuba served as the key navigational reference they would use to guide them on their way to Miami. Following this route meant Haitians had to traverse the notoriously tumultuous waters of the Windward Passage—the "channel of wind" (kanal di van) in Haitian Kreyòl—between Cuba and Haiti, a crossing which often left vessels damaged and in need of repairs. While the town of Maisí on Cuba's eastern tip commonly served this purpose nicely, some captains ended up further west in the protective waters of Guantanamo Bay.

In the 1970s, several ships carrying a large amount of Haitians landed at Guantanamo forcing the US military to handle the migrants and thus, the US military base at Guantanamo became a de facto area for processing migrants attempting to come to United States. After processing migrants through Guantanamo, the US government observed that the processing of migrants at the base provided much less oversight from the legal system and was done in a quicker proceedings in comparison to processing Haitian migrants on the US mainland. As a result as early as 1978, the US Immigration and Naturalization Service (INS) had discussed plans regarding "the feasibility of having the Coast Guard transport Haitians to Guantanamo Bay." As Kahn writes: "In other words, rather than wait for Haitian asylum seekers to sail up to the base's piers, higher-ups at INS had begun to consider the possibility of just bringing Haitians directly to Guantanamo. Although the reasoning behind this proposal is not stated explicitly, it is patently obvious: it was easier to get rid of Haitians at the base. With that, the seeds of a more formal version of ad hoc asylum processing at Guantanamo were planted."

During the Reagan administration, detention and processing of migrants at Guantanamo went down with the creation in 1980 of the Haitian Migrant Interdiction Operations (HMIO), which is now known as the as Alien Migrant Interdiction Operations (AMIO). This program used the Coast Guard to essential intercept migrant ships at sea and process them on the ship's deck for either return to their country or for potential asylum claims. As a result of these programs, the use of Guantanamo as a major staging place for migrant processing would not occur again until the 1990s.

=== Haitian crises and GMOC ===
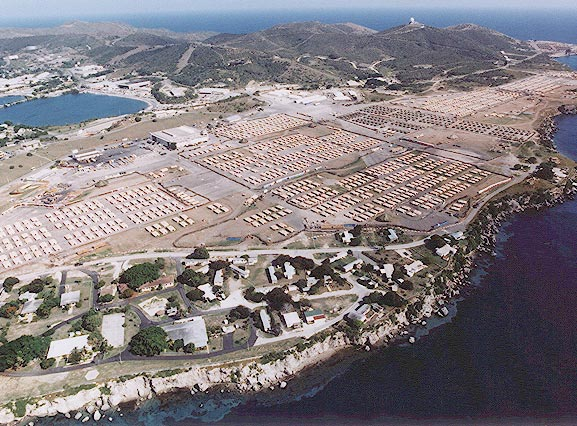
A tent facility at a disused NSGB air terminal used to hold Haitian migrants

While normally the GMOC only detains a small number of migrants, there was a large influx of migrants from Haiti after Jean-Bertrand Aristide was overthrown in the 1991 Haitian coup d'état. In response to human rights violations by the Haitian military, approximately 40,000 Haitians fled the country. Under the law, if the US government encountered any fleeing Haitians at sea and those Haitian had a "credible fear of persecution on account of race, religion, nationality, membership in a particular social group, or political opinion", then those Haitians could be taken to GMOC and processed for asylum claims. At the time, there was a large HIV positive population in Haiti and those asylees who tested positive for HIV were housed at a separate facility at Guantanamo Bay, Camp Bulkeley. As a result at one point in the 1990s the facility held "thousands of Haitian migrants inside the Guantanamo base, including in a notorious camp for those diagnosed with HIV, who were banned from entering the U.S. at the time."

Judge Sterling Johnson, Jr., of the US District Court reviewing the conditions at the HIV detention camp that held roughly "200 HIV-positive Haitian refugees" described it as follows:

They live in camps surrounded by razor barbed wire. They tie plastic garbage bags to the sides of the building to keep the rain out. They sleep on cots and hang sheets to create some semblance of privacy. They are guarded by the military and are not permitted to leave the camp, except under military escort. The Haitian detainees have been subjected to pre-dawn military sweeps as they sleep by as many as 400 soldiers dressed in full riot gear. They are confined like prisoners and are subject to detention in the brig without hearing for camp rule infractions.

After reviewing the rights of the detainees, Johnson ordered the United States to shut down its HIV detention center "because of ongoing constitutional, statutory, and regulatory violations of the detainees' rights" and release its 143 HIV-positive adults, two HIV-negative adults, and 13 untested children. Johnson found that some of the migrants had been "detained for almost 2 years, with no indication of when, if ever, they would be released (although they had been told that they could be there for 10 to 20 years or until a cure for AIDS was found)." The court stated:

"[T]he detained Haitians are neither criminals nor national security risks. Some are pregnant women and others are children. Simply put, they are merely the unfortunate victims of a fatal disease. [...] Where detention no longer serves a legitimate purpose, the detainees must be released. The Haitian camp at Guantanamo is the only known refugee camp in the world composed entirely of HIV+ refugees. The Haitians' plight is a tragedy of immense proportion and their continued detainment is totally unacceptable to this Court."

The HIV detention camp closed on July 18, 1993.

=== Cuban Crises ===
After Bill Clinton reversed a nearly 30-year-old policy of immediate amnesty for Cubans arriving to the US, Cubans began to be sent to the GMOC. During this time both Cubans and Haitians were coming to Guantanamo detention facilities. In an effort to decrease the size of the camp, the US tried to convince other countries in the Caribbean or Latin America to accept either Haitian or Cuban refugees. Up to 21,000 Haitians were held in Guantanamo at one time during this wave of the Haitian refugee camp. More than 30,000 Cubans were detained at once at Guantanamo. The main problem for the camp in sustaining so many people was primarily infrastructure such as water, electricity, and sewage, not space. Roughly 10,000 Haitians agreed to return home after President Aristide was returned to power in October 1994. However, 6,000 were forcibly repatriated against their wishes. By December 1994, 5,000 Haitian refugees were still at the camp. The UNHCR voiced disapproval of the US policy of forced repatriation of Haitians and suggested it was outside international refugee law in early 1995.

=== GMOC from 2000 to 2025 ===
After the turmoil of the 1990s, the United States moved to a different system for processing migrants detained at sea. According to Jeffrey S. Kahn, Associate Professor of Anthropology at the University of California, Davis, this system operates as follows: "if the [US] Coast Guard stops a vessel and those aboard end up passing a 'credible fear' interview, they are taken to Guantanamo for an additional interview to determine if they have a 'well-founded fear of persecution,' ... [and if] they pass that second screening, the [US] State Department works to resettle them in third countries, like France or Australia. The deliberate aim is to destroy any perception that getting to Guantanamo is a way to get to the United States. To use the jargon of the State Department, the aim is to avoid 'magnetizing' the base."

After the large increase of migrant detentions during certain political crises in the 1990s, the GMOC greatly contracted to a small detention facility. Prior to the Trump administration's announcement in 2025, the GMOC migrant center had a reported total capacity of around 130 with it usually only holding a small number of migrants in the double digits. During this time, "[a] relatively small number of migrants are housed in barrack-like facilities while they undergo interviews with asylum officers" and "[a]sylum-seekers who passed those initial interviews have been referred for resettlement in third countries like Australia and Canada." The US has sought to avoid allowing those caught at sea to obtain asylum within the US to deter that effort.

The housing of migrants at the Guantanamo Bay detention camp had been criticized by human rights groups prior to changes in 2025. The International Refugee Assistance Project said that those who were detained there "described unsanitary conditions, families with young children housed together with single adults, a lack of access to confidential phone calls, and the absence of educational services for children." The American Civil Liberties Union had filed for information about the detention of migrants at the GMOC but the Biden administration had stated that it "is not a detention facility and none of the migrants there are detained". According to the IRAP, "[r]efugees were regularly confined to their rooms for weeks at a time, and denied confidential phone calls, even with their lawyers."

In 2022, it was reported that the Biden administration was considering holding a potential surge of Haitians migrants at Guantanamo. When the Biden administration was asked about using the GMOC to hold migrants that were detained at the southern Border Department of Homeland Security Secretary Alejandro Mayorkas stated: "Guantanamo was a place that historically has been used to return individuals who are interdicted at sea. That is not applicable to the individuals whom we are encountering along the southern border. That is just misinformation."

== Second Trump presidency ==
On January 29, 2025, President Donald Trump announced his intention to expand the GMOC to house up to 30,000 migrants under detention, separate from the high-security military prison at Guantanamo Bay, and instructed the Departments of Defense and Homeland Security to "begin preparing the 30,000-person migrant facility at Guantanamo Bay". Trump stated what he signed was an executive order, although what he had in fact issued was a Presidential Memorandum. Titled "Expanding Migrant Operations Center at Naval Station Guantanamo Bay to Full Capacity", the memorandum stated:

I hereby direct the Secretary of Defense and the Secretary of Homeland Security to take all appropriate actions to expand the Migrant Operations Center at Naval Station Guantanamo Bay to full capacity to provide additional detention space for high-priority criminal aliens unlawfully present in the United States, and to address attendant immigration enforcement needs identified by the Department of Defense and the Department of Homeland Security. This memorandum is issued in order to halt the border invasion, dismantle criminal cartels, and restore national sovereignty. This memorandum is not intended to, and does not, create any right or benefit, substantive or procedural, enforceable at law or in equity by any party against the United States, its departments, agencies, or entities, its officers, employees, or agents, or any other person.

The migrant facility will be run by U.S. Immigration and Customs Enforcement (ICE). This decision came shortly after Trump signed the Laken Riley Act that requires "undocumented immigrants who are arrested for theft or violent crimes to be held in jail pending trial." Trump said the new detention policy would "detain the worst criminal illegal aliens threatening the American people" and that some migrants that would be refused deportation by their countries would be held at GMOC indefinitely: "Some of them are so bad we do not even trust the countries to hold them because we do not want them coming back, so we're going to send them out to Guantanamo." Trump noted that this would double the detention capacity of ICE and noted that "Gitmo is a tough place to get out." However, the executive memorandum that Trump signed did not state a specific number of migrants to be detained at the facility but did call for "additional detention space." Trump's border czar Tom Homan said the facility would be planned to hold the "worst of the worst." Homeland Security Secretary Kristi Noem stated that Congress would need a lot of money for the facility through "reconciliation and appropriations".

=== Implementation ===
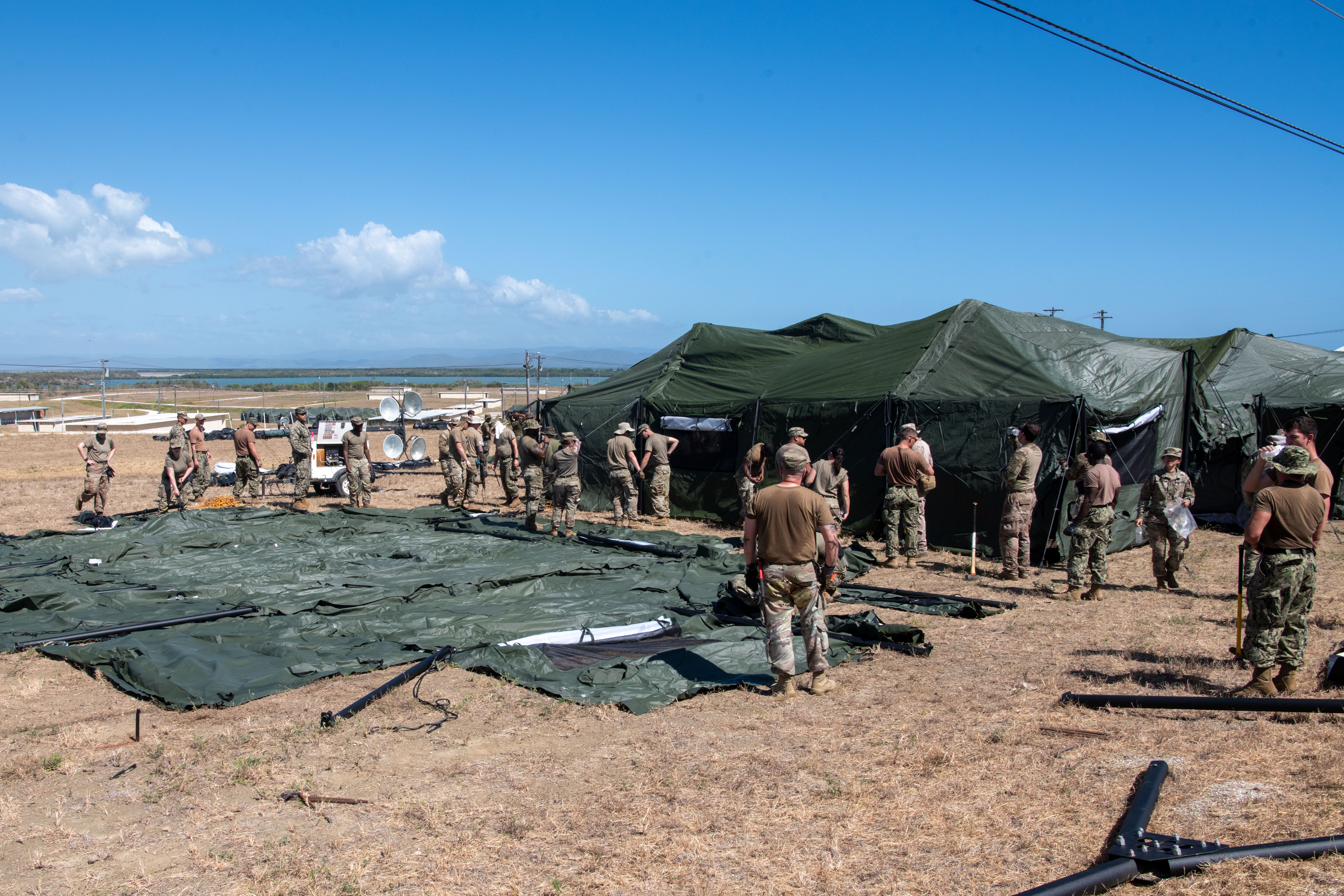
A GMOC tent facility under construction in February 2025

Despite receiving no instructions on how to implement Trump's plan for detaining 30,000 migrants, the Defense Department moved 1,100 troops to Guantanamo to plan for the expansion of the GMOC to 30,000. These troops help set up thousands of tents to detain the migrants.

On February 4, 2025, the Trump Administration sent the first group of 10 "high-threat" migrants detainees to the GMOC. Officials have stated that these migrants were "Venezuelan men with affiliations to Tren de Aragua, a gang that originated in Venezuela's prisons". Officials at the base set up tent facilities outside of the Migrant Operations Center to hold the increased amount of migrants since the current facilities could not hold that number. While Trump's presidential memorandum specified that migrants would be held at the GMOC, 53 Venezuelan migrants who were transported to Guantanamo in response to the memorandum were reported to be held by military guards at Camp 6, a military prison previously used to hold Al-Qaeda suspects.

On February 12, 2025, the New York Times reported that 98 migrants were being held in the facility, including the 53 Venezuelans held at Camp 6. The remaining 45 migrants were being held in a lower-security building on the other side of the base guarded by members of the U.S. Coast Guard. That number increased to 178 by February 20 as reported by the Trump administration in a lawsuit, with all the migrants being from Venezuela. 127 were held at Camp 6 while the remaining 51 were held at the actual GMOC facility. On February 20, a Department of Homeland Security official said that all 178 migrants had been removed from the GMOC. 177 were deported to Venezuela via Honduras, while one was transferred to a detention facility in the United States. The official also said that the GMOC would continue to be used as a "staging area" for migrants pending deportation, although DHS has asked the Department of Defense to look for alternate locations to fill that role. The status of detainees as gang members was disputed by some families, who alleged non-gang-members with tattoos were targeted so they could be photographed in shackles for public relations purposes. Federal officials responding to an ACLU lawsuit identified 51 of the 178 deportees as "lower-threat". Later reports stated that the 51 deportees were "considered to be non-criminal, meaning they had committed no crime other than being present in the United States unlawfully, according to a Department of Homeland Security official."

As late as March 2025 there was still no specific plans by DHS and the Pentagon on how to work together to house the 30,000 migrants.

On March 1, the ACLU, the Center for Constitutional Rights, and the International Refugee Assistance Project worked together to file suit in the case of Escalona v. Noem alleging that it is illegal to move the migrants to Guantanamo.

On March 5, NBC News reported some in the Trump administration were reconsidering using Guantánamo as a migrant detention facility. Among the reasons for this were the lack of advance planning for the effort, the costs of transferring and detaining migrants there, uncertainties about which department of government (ICE or Defense) would be responsible for the migrants, the lack of policy guidance around support for facilities and services for migrants and the questionable legality of the transfers. The costs of using the Defense Department to fly detainees to Guantanamo has been calculated to be "$23,000 to $27,000 per detainee" while the cost to fly them on charter flights has been calculated to be "$6,929 to $26,795 per hour". Sources with knowledge of the events claimed a maximum of 178 migrants, of whom 51 had no criminal records, had ever been held at the base and that the current population was around 20. A bipartisan congressional delegation that had been scheduled to travel to Guantanamo was cancelled by U.S. Secretary of Defense Pete Hegseth and had not been rescheduled as of the date of the report.

On March 13, a spokesperson for the US Southern Command confirmed that no migrants were currently being held at Guantánamo. By early April several dozen migrants "on final orders supposedly to head to their final destination" were being temporarily held at Guantanamo, including Nicaraguans who had been added to a deportation flight originating in Louisiana. The estimates were by the end of March that less than 400 detainees had been sent to the base.

The Pentagon has estimated the cost to the U.S. Government of the expanded GMOC of $40 million in the first month. According to U.S. Senator Gary Peters, detaining migrants at Guantanamo Bay cost $100,000 per day per detainee.

On March 28, 2025, a Senate delegation consisting of Senators Jack Reed, Jeanne Shaheen, Gary Peters, Alex Padilla, and Angus King visited the GMOC and issued a joint statement after the visit. They stated: "After examining the migrant relocation activities at Guantánamo Bay, we are outraged by the scale and wastefulness of the Trump administration's misuse of our military...[This operation] is "unsustainably expensive, operating under questionable legal authority, and harmful to our military readiness... The military “were rushed to Guantánamo Bay without notice, leaving their critical day-to-day military missions behind in order to build tents that should never be filled and guard immigrants who should never be held there...This would be better both economically and also in terms of legal clarity if the military were not involved."

In June 2025, after administration efforts to dramatically increase detention of migrants, Politico reported on plans to begin sending thousands of those detained to Guantanamo Bay. Those considered for transfer reportedly included 800 Europeans, some from nations considered to be cooperative in receiving their deported citizens. Days later, those plans appeared to have been put on hold and administration spokespeople denied their existence.

According to CBS News, in May 2026, six Haitian nationals were being held at the facility. In the year prior, 832 people had been transferred to the facility. Internal documents "indicate the base's capacity to hold immigration detainees is limited to roughly 400 beds" and in May 2026, "fewer than 2% of the beds were occupied". At least eight migrants from Somalia were held at the facility in September 2026 before being deported to Somalia.

=== Reactions ===
The Pentagon had not been previously informed of such a plan and it "came as a shock" when announced resulting in it "rushing to come up with a plan." Prior to the announcement, ICE could only hold about 40,000 migrants at its current facilities. After the announcement, members of ICE, DHS, and the military were unsure which group would have legal authority over the migrants, who would be in charge of detaining the migrants, what rights the migrants would have under the new Presidential memorandum, and how to logistically create the new facilities that could house 30,000 new migrants along with the needed sanitation, food, and medical care. The current increase of so many migrants on the 45 square-mile base would be logistically difficult. According to a former senior official in the US government: "The total cost for this would quickly skyrocket into tens of millions, if not hundreds of millions, of dollars...Guantanamo can look like the easy button to press, but it brings with it a whole bundle of problems."

Members of the Trump administration expressed support for the plan. United States Secretary of Defense, Pete Hegseth, who had previously worked at the Guantanamo Bay detention camp as an infantry platoon leader, stated that the GMOC was "the perfect option for rounding up tens of thousands of illegal aliens and sending them back to their countries of origin with proper processing." Hegseth continued stating: "Gitmo has been used for DECADES, including under Democrat presidents like Bill Clinton, to temporarily house migrants...This is not the detention facilities (where I served) for Al Qaeda; this is using specific facilities for migrants/illegals on other parts of the naval station." Hegseth also stated that it would be better to hold the migrants in Gitmo, a "safe location." After the first migrants arrived at the facility, Hegseth stated "Where are you going to put Tren De Aragua before you send them all the way back? How about a maximum security prison at Guantanamo Bay, where we have the space."

However, the current plan also sparked intense opposition. Debra Schneider, an immigration attorney who dealt with immigration issues at GMOC, expressed concerns about potential lack of access to legal representation, while Tom Jawetz, a senior lawyer in the Homeland Security Department during the Biden administration, stated "I just don't know how [the plan is] legal." Members of the Cuban government also criticized the planned expansion of migrant facilities, noting the proximity to the Guantanamo Bay detention center used to imprison suspected terrorists during the War on Terror.

Australian lawyer Stephen Kenny, who represented the Gitmo detainee David Hicks and visited Gitmo several times, stated that it was a very small base with limited infrastructure that were "only designed for about 200 people." "I think there would be a need for considerable building work to be done before they can house 30,000 detainees there, unless they're only held there for a very short period of time," he said. Kenny said it would be "extremely isolating" and "would be very difficult for them to access their legal rights, and for family and lawyers to have any real contact with them...You won't be able to get access without the assistance of the military."

Deepa Alagesan, a senior supervising lawyer with the IRAP, stated that the massive increase in migrants being sent to the GMOC was "definitely a scary prospect". Vince Warren, the executive director of the Center for Constitutional Rights, said Trump's decision "sends a clear message: migrants and asylum seekers are being cast as the new terrorist threat, deserving to be discarded in an island prison, removed from legal and social services and supports." Daphne Eviatar, the director at Amnesty International USA stated: "Another terrible idea, just when we were getting closer to closing the unlawful prison that's there already...Indefinite detention without due process at Guantanamo has been a powerful recruiting tool for US enemies; it has not made anyone safer." Anthony Scaramucci, who briefly served as the White House Director of Communications under President Trump tweeted in response to the announcement of the expansion of the detention facility: "Also known as a concentration camp. Yet no dissent. No courageous political leader willing to stand up to this."
