= Haitian refugee crisis =

1991 crisis caused by political unrest

- Part of the aftermath of the 1991 Haitian coup d'état
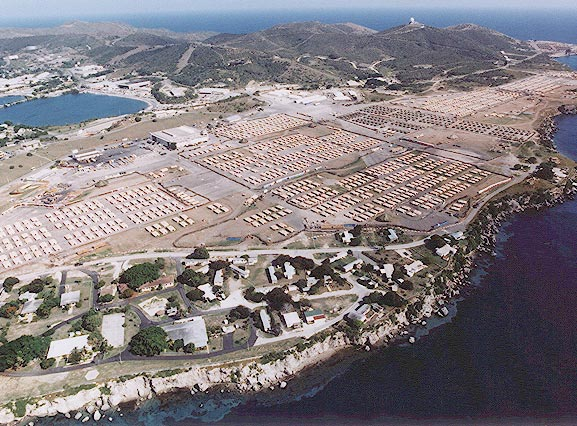
- Most Haitian refugees were interned in a tent camp on a disused air terminal at Guantanamo, seen here.
- Date: 1991-1994
- Location: Guantanamo Bay Naval Base
- Participants: Haitian boat people Government of the United States
- Outcome: HIV outbreak at refugee camp; Refugees either immigrated or repatriated (forcibly and voluntarily)

The Haitian refugee crisis began in 1991 when tens of thousands of refugees from Haiti fled to the United States on boats and rafts after Jean-Bertrand Aristide, the democratically elected president of Haiti, was overthrown and the military government began persecuting and executing his followers. Those who were intercepted by the US Coast Guard were taken to a camp at Guantanamo Bay to await a "screening process". The camp quickly reached a maximum of 12,500 people. It was eventually reduced to 270 refugees - the result of the US policy adopting a strict policy of forced repatriation for both those intercepted at sea, while those who remained were those who either had HIV or were related to someone who did, and were kept at the camp while it was determined if they qualified for an HIV "waiver" to allow their entry into the US. The HIV+ refugees were quarantined in a section of the military base known as Camp Bulkeley, where they faced numerous human rights violations. In 1993, they were brought into the United States after US District Judge Sterling Johnson Jr. ruled the camp was an "HIV prison camp," that the conditions there were inhumane, and that keeping political refugees in indefinite detention violated their rights as asylum seekers.

In 1994, Guantanamo was again used as a refugee camp. This time both Haitians and Cuban refugees were detained there, numbering around 50,000. There were several important court cases and policies made that determined conditions and often location for the refugees. Haitians stopped being held at Guantanamo in the mid-1990s. The number of Haitians granted asylum status varied throughout the use of the military base as a refugee camp. It was as high 30% in the early 1990s and as low as 5% in 1994. Those who were repatriated were handed over to Haitian officials who made a file of them including photos and fingerprints labeling them to be Aristide supporters which was a dangerous title to have at the time. Guantanamo was chosen to be a refugee camp because it was in between the US and Haiti and also primarily existed outside the jurisdiction of US constitutional law.

== Background ==
The first "boat people" landed in the US in 1972. From 1972 through 1977 there was an estimated 3,500 Haitians who landed on Florida's coast seeking refuge, according to the New York Library's Archives. This was in response to a brutal dictatorship by François and Jean-Claude Duvalier. As became the standard, Haitian refugees fleeing the dictatorship were met with "arrest, jail, the denial of asylum, and swift expulsion." The administration of US President Jimmy Carter took a different approach in 1980 because a large wave of about 125,000 Cuban refugees landed in the US. They became known as Mariel Cubans, and the US government could not treat Haitians and Cubans with vastly different policies. Carter created a new immigration category called "entrants" for Haitians and Cubans "whose fate was to be decided at a later date by legislation" but who were allowed to be in the US.

US President Ronald Reagan changed the policy in 1981 and sent the Coast Guard to intercept and repatriate Haitians fleeing by boat. He jailed the refugees who made it to the United States. Refugees continued to flee during the militant governments that followed the Duvaliers. Jean-Bertrand Aristide was in power for eight months before being overthrown. During this time both human rights abuses decreased and the number of people trying to leave decreased by one third. Six weeks after Aristide was overthrown, at least 1,500 Haitians had been killed. The number of refugees fleeing by boat skyrocketed to new levels as did the people fleeing into the Dominican Republic. In the entire decade before Aristide was overthrown, 25,000 Haitians were intercepted at sea; 38,000 were intercepted in the first year after he was overthrown.

The US had well established methods of intercepting, jailing, and repatriating Haitians by the time the largest wave of people seeking refuge arrived. These policies were pursued by multiple US presidents because of American anti-Haitian biases that saw Haitian immigrants as a threat based on a combination of racism, nationalism, xenophobia, classism, and misperceptions that Haitians carried disease at higher numbers than other nationalities.

== History ==
=== Presidency of George H. W. Bush ===
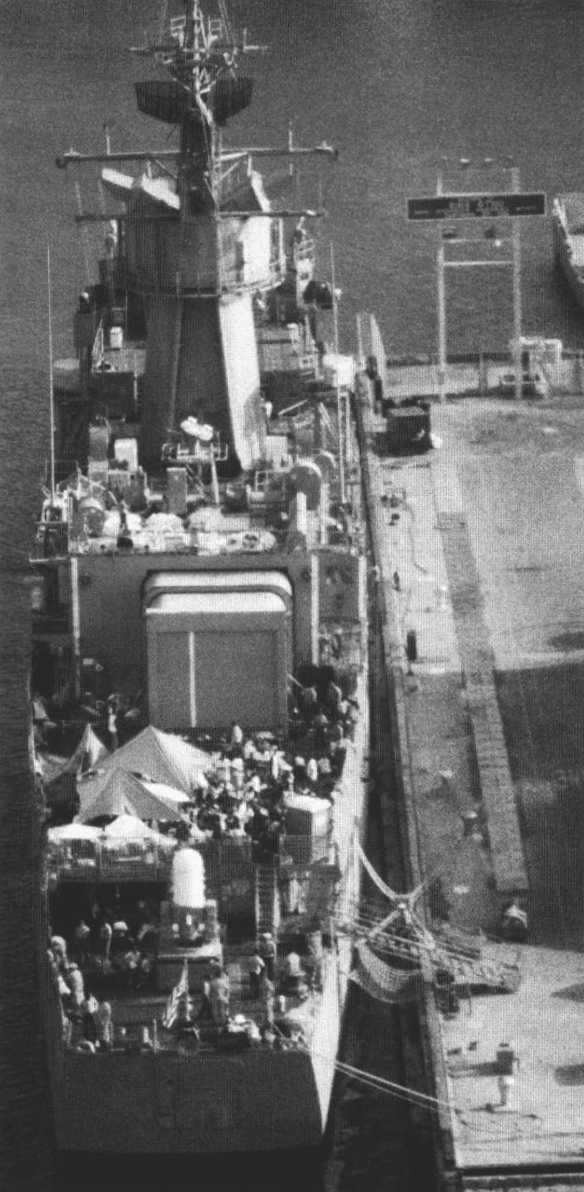
USS Moinester (FF-1097) with Haitian refugees at Guantanamo Bay 1991

The number of Haitian refugees fleeing the country by boat escalated to new levels after Aristide was overthrown. The George H. W. Bush administration opted to continue the policy of repatriation that had been used for Haitian boat people previously when they were fleeing the Duvalier dictatorship. If the refugees made it to US soil, they would be protected from repatriation by international law. The administration began redirecting the refugees to Guantanamo Bay after the Haitian Refugee Center won a court case that established a temporary restraining order against forced repatriation. By November 1991, the Administration had to raise the previous cap of 2,500 refugees at Guantanamo. On February 28, 1992, the House of Representatives passed a bill introduced by Romano Mazzoli to allow Haitian refugees to remain at Guantanamo for 6 months. The camp continued to grow substantially until May 1992 when around 11,300 refugees were being held at the military base. The refugees were held on six subcamps in McCalla Airfield and Camp Bulkeley. There weren't enough supplies. Many refugees slept on cardboard or bare ground and others on cots. Each camp was surrounded in barb wire fencing. Refugees rotated through each camp as they passed or failed each exam on the way to asylum. However, refugees were not told the significance of the movement between subcamps.

Bush announced that the US would begin slowly emptying the refugee camps and instead solely return the Haitians trying to escape persecution back to Haiti through Executive Order 12,807 called the Kennebunkport Order in May 1992. The order did not screen the Haitians for potential to seek asylum as earlier policies technically required. The administration expressed fears of the camp inspiring Haitians to try to leave and favored a harsher policy to discourage escaping by boat. As the claims of the refugees at Guantanamo were processed, the refugees were slowly relocated, brought to the US, or often repatriated throughout the end of Bush's presidency. From its beginning until March 1992, 34,000 refugees had passed through the camp. Permission to pursue asylum in the US was given to roughly a third of them. A small group of refugees was kept at Guantanamo. The remaining refugees at Guantanamo were approved for filing for asylum but tested positive for HIV or had family of those who tested positive and therefore continued to be held at Guantanamo at a section of the base known as Camp Bukeley.

=== Presidency of Bill Clinton ===
Bill Clinton had campaigned against the forced repatriations during the 1992 US presidential race. He changed his mind shortly before taking office in 1993 and instead continued the Kennebunkport Order policy of forced repatriation. He wanted to stabilize Haiti and reinstall Aristide through force in part to discourage more people from fleeing. Meanwhile, 270 refugees remained in Camp Bulkeley due to their connection to HIV. They were brought to the US after a legal battle headed by the Haitian Centers Council. The HIV camp closed on July 18, 1993.

Less than a year later, Guantanamo was again opened to hold refugees in June 1994. The new camp held first Haitians then Haitians and Cubans. Cubans only began to be sent to Guantanamo after Clinton reversed a nearly 30-year-old policy of immediate amnesty for Cubans arriving to the US. However, the Cubans were treated noticeably better than the Haitians. In an effort to decrease the size of the camp, the US tried to convince other countries in the Caribbean or Latin America to accept either Haitian or Cuban refugees. Up to 21,000 Haitians were held in Guantanamo at one time during this wave of the Haitian refugee camp. More than 30,000 Cubans were detained at once at the camp. The main problem for the camp in sustaining so many people was primarily infrastructure such as water, electricity, and sewage, not space. Roughly 10,000 Haitians agreed to return home after President Aristide was returned to power in October 1994. However, 6,000 were forcibly repatriated against their wishes. By December 1994, 5,000 Haitian refugees were still at the camp. The UNHCR voiced disapproval of the US policy of forced repatriation of Haitians and suggested it was outside international refugee law in early 1995. Haitians remained at Guantanamo until at least May 1995.

== Controversy ==
=== Camp Bulkeley HIV quarantine ===
Camp Bulkeley began under US President George H. W. Bush in late 1991 and ended under Bill Clinton 1993. Camp Bulkeley was used to hold 270 refugees approved for asylum who tested positive for HIV or were related to someone with HIV at the camp. The presence of HIV/AIDS meant they were not allowed to come to the US according to a 1987 law. Simultaneously, they could not be repatriated to Haiti due to international law protecting approved asylum seekers. The US said the camp was a humanitarian endeavor.

Karma Chavez wrote, "These refugees lived in deplorable conditions, were subjected to violence and repression by the US military, deprived of proper medical care, and left without any legal recourse of rights." According to the research of A. Naomi Paik, the food was rotten and the camps were squalid and lacked proper infrastructure for sanitation. Boredom filled each day. Medical procedures happened without consent administration of including Depo Provera, a long term birth control. "The refugees question[ed] whether the U.S. state intended for them to live longer or die sooner," wrote Paik.

The treatment of these refugees is part of a larger discrimination against Haitians though a Center for Disease Control enforced association with the disease and the nationality. The CDC identified the Haitian nationality as being an at-risk group of HIV. ACT UP was a major advocacy group for ending the detention of HIV+ Haitians in Guantanamo.

On March 26, 1993, U.S. District Judge Sterling Johnson Jr. ruled that the "government either had to provide medical treatment for those with the AIDS virus or send them where they could be treated" for what he famously deemed a "HIV prison camp." The Clinton Administration that replied saying 36 refugees with HIV would be brought to the US. As the first part of the follow-through on Judge Johnson's ruling in early April 1993, 20 Haitians, 16 with HIV and 4 relatives came to the US. Those with low immune cell counts received the highest priority for leaving the detention camp. In early June 1993, Judge Johnson ordered that the remaining refugees be taken away from Guantanamo within ten days to two weeks. The camp finally closed on July 18, 1993. Half of the Haitian survivors of Camp Bulkeley had died by 2013.

In January 2010 United States Air Force reservists were deployed to help victims of the 2010 Haiti earthquake, and some of those reservists worked to prepare the Guantanamo base to receive more Haitian refugees.

=== Differing treatment of Cubans and Haitians ===
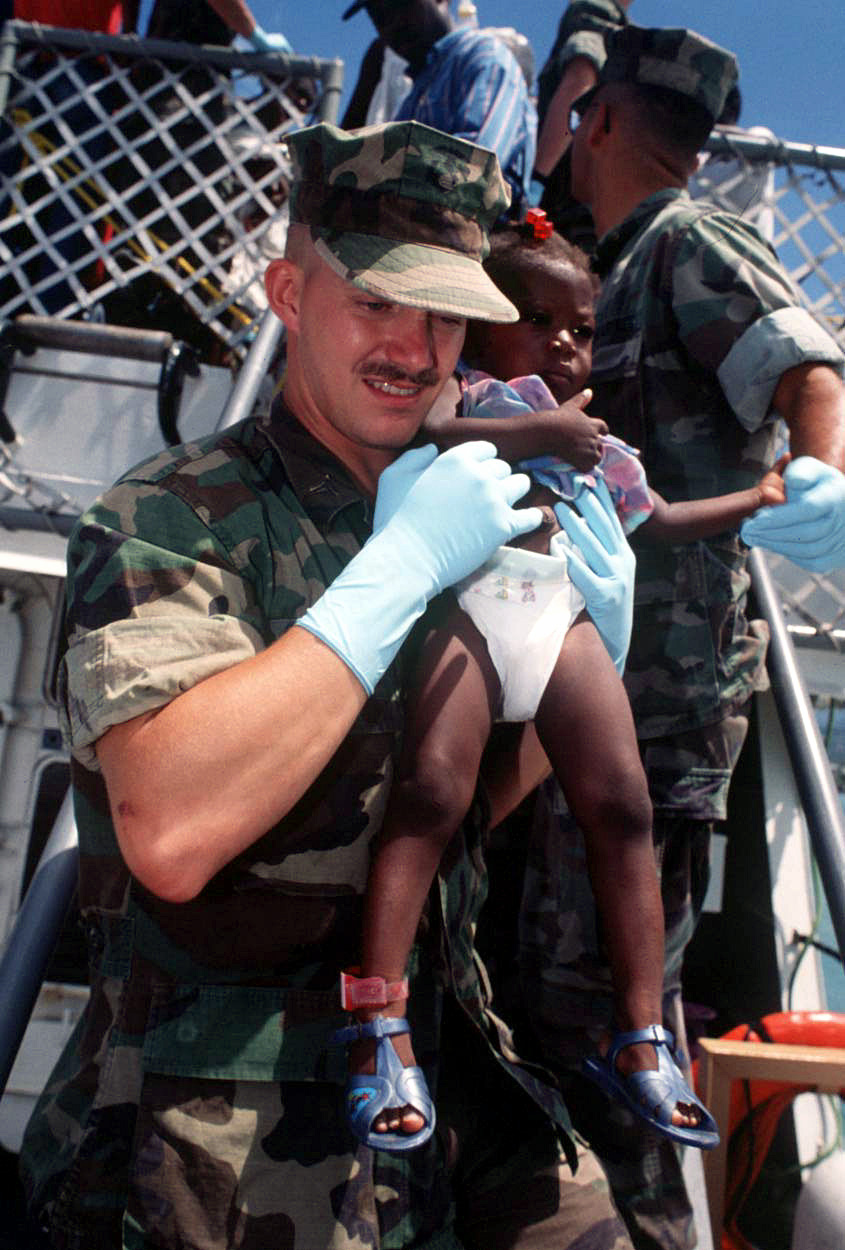
Young Haitian refugee returning from Guantanamo to Haiti

Largely due to the politics of the Cold War, the US supported the Haitian government under the Duvaliers and simultaneously did not support the Cuban government under Castro. Because of these international relations, the US encouraged Cuban refugees to come to the US but denied this option to Haitian refugees. The US called the Haitian refugees "economic migrants" and was therefore able to reject asylum obligations. Also, there was racial discrimination separating the treatment of Haitians and Cubans as found in the US Court of Appeals, Second Circuit with Haitian Centers Council v. McNary in 1992. The treatment of the two groups was frequently compared.

The special treatment of Cuban refugees decreased when they were being held at Guantanamo. Nevertheless, considerable disparities continued. The Cubans had the advantage of having a strong political block already in the US that advocated for the Cubans in Guantanamo. For example, the US said it would encourage voluntary repatriation for Cubans; however, Haitians were forced to repatriate. In another example, 200 Haitian unaccompanied children were left at Guantanamo long after the Cuban children of the same position were brought to the US. Very few of the Haitian unaccompanied minors were allowed to enter the US. By April 1995, only 23 of about 300 children had been accepted. All of the unaccompanied Cuban children were admitted to the US. HIV testing was not required for Cubans or other non-Haitian groups emigrating to the US but was mandatory for Haitians immigrating to the US. The differences between the two groups challenged the treatment both groups were receiving.

== See also ==
- Cuban refugees at the Guantanamo Bay Naval Base
