= Camp Justice =

Camp Justice may refer to:

- Camp Justice (Iraq), a military base in Iraq
- Camp Justice (Diego Garcia), a US base in the disputed Chagos Archipelago
- Camp Justice (Guantanamo) the complex where captives will face charges before the Guantanamo military commissions.
