= VC-10 Challengers =

Fleet Composite Squadron 10
- Active: 1 December 1943 to 14 Aug 1993
- Country: United States
- Branch: United States Navy
- Type: Fleet Composite
- Role: Air interdiction Close air support
- Part of: fleet support
- Garrison/HQ: Guantanamo Bay, Cuba
- Nickname: Challengers
- Motto: We work in a communist country every day!

Aircraft flown
- Attack: A-4 Skyhawk
- Fighter: F-8 Crusader

VC-10 Composite Squadron Challengers was a United States Navy aircraft squadron. It was originally known as the Mallards in 1943, but when assigned the F-8 Crusader the squadron pilots unofficially used the name "Challengers". The squadron was formally known as the Challengers from 1961 through 1993.

== History ==
There have been two separate and unrelated squadrons which have borne the designation VC-10.

=== First VC-10 ===
The first squadron to bear the designation VC-10 was established as Composite Squadron TEN (VC-10) 23 September 1943 at Naval Air Station Seattle (Sand Point) in Seattle, Washington. It operated both fighters and torpedo bombers. Planes and material allowance for the squadron were drawn at Sand Point. On 5 April 1944, VC-10 was assigned as part of the air group for the escort carrier USS Gambier Bay. Gambier Bay was sunk in the Battle off Samar. At the time, the squadron had 195 men and 31 pilots assigned. After Gambier Bay's sinking the squadron operated for a time from fields on Leyte and from other carriers. With the Gambier Bay gone, most squadron members were sent back to the United States on leave, while some were transferred to other squadrons. In January 1945 the squadron was reconstituted at NAAS Ventura County Airport, California. The squadron spent the remainder the war training in preparation for redeployment. It was disestablished with the end of the war.

=== Second VC-10 ===
The squadron that would eventually become the second VC-10 squadron was originally established on 1 December 1943 as Utility Squadron SIXTEEN (VJ-16) at NAS Isla Grande in San Juan, Puerto Rico. VJ-16's mission was to provide gunnery target tow services, radar tracking, search and rescue, and photographic services to ships and aircraft in the Caribbean area. As was typical for most of its service, the squadron was equipped from the outset with a variety of aircraft types. Initially, the squadron's inventory consisted of Grumman J2F-5/6 Duck, Consolidated PBY-5/5A Catalina, Grumman TBF-1 Avenger, Douglas SBD-5 Dauntless and North American SNJ-4 aircraft.

After a brief move to NAAF Roosevelt Roads, Puerto Rico in April 1944, VJ-16 settled in at NAS Miami, Florida in May 1944 and added Martin JM-1/2 Marauder, Grumman F6F-5 Hellcat, General Motors FM-2 Wildcat and Grumman TBM-1J/3J Avenger aircraft to its roster. For the remainder of World War II, the squadron operated detachments in Florida, Louisiana, Texas, Brazil, Cuba, Panama and Trinidad. VJ-16 consolidated its operations at NAS Guantanamo Bay/McCalla Field, Cuba in April 1945 and was redesignated as Utility Squadron TEN (VU-10) on 15 Nov 1945.

Over the next fifteen years, VU-10 variously operated JD-1, UF-1, Martin PBM-5A Mariner, Consolidated PBY-6A Catalina, Douglas R4D-5 Skytain, Beechcraft SNB-5, Grumman F6F-5D Hellcat, Grumman F7F-2D Tigercat, Grumman F8F-2 Bearcat, Grumman F9F-6/8 Cougar and North American FJ-3 Fury aircraft, as well as Grumman F6F-5K Hellcat, Culver TD2C, and Radioplane KD2R-5 target drones. In 1957, VU-10 also established an operating detachment at NAS Jacksonville, Florida that was absorbed into Utility Squadron FOUR (VU-4) in 1963.

With the closure of McCalla Field, VU-10 moved to the nearby NAS Guantanamo Bay/Leeward Point Field in January 1960 and added defense of the base as one of its missions after the Cuban Revolution. During the October 1962 Cuban Missile Crisis, VU-10's F-8A Crusader fighters became the front line defense force for the base against both Cuban and deployed Soviet forces. The squadron, which acquired Grumman US-2C Trackers and, in succession, F-8B/D/A/C/K Crusaders, was redesignated as Fleet Composite Squadron TEN (FLECOMPRON TEN or VC-10) on 1 July 1965.

TA-4J Skyhawk IIs modified to carry air-to-ground ordnance and AIM-9 Sidewinder air-to-air missiles replaced the last of VC-10's F-8 Crusaders in 1976, augmented by an EA-4F Skyhawk II in the late 1980s. VC-10 continued to provide aerial target services for fleet training and dissimilar air combat maneuver training (DACT) for fleet aircraft during Atlantic Fleet carrier battle group deployment work-ups.

VC-10 was disestablished at Naval Station Guantanamo Bay on 14 August 1993 as part of a post-Cold War reduction in naval forces and the transfer of the composite squadron mission to the Naval Air Reserve.

== Patches ==
- 1961-1972, VC-10's patch displays a Crusader's Cross on a shield (also, VU-10)
- 1972-1993, VC-10's patch displays a Black Celtic Fighting Lion superimposed on a red, white and blue background

== Aircraft assigned ==
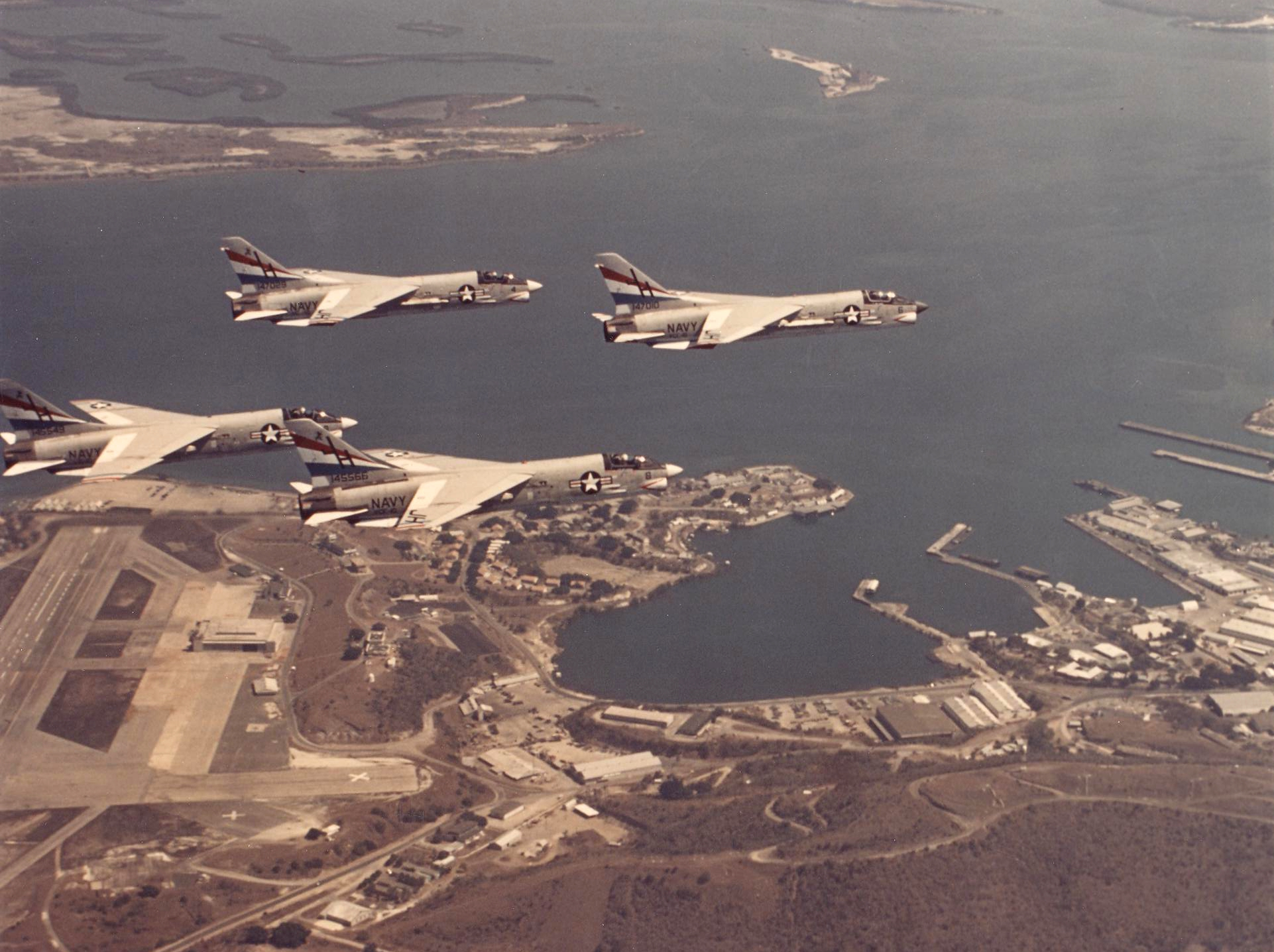
F-8K Crusaders of VC-10 over Guantanamo, in 1974.

- Martin JM-1 (Martin B-26 Marauder) - 1943
- Grumman F8F Bearcat - 1947
- Grumman F9F Cougar - 1954
- North American FJ Fury (FJ-3) - 1953
- Chance Vought F-8 Crusader - 1961
- Grumman S-2 Tracker (US-2) - 1966
- Douglas A-4 Skyhawk (TF-4F) - March 1975
- Douglas A-4 Skyhawk (TA-4J) - July 1975

== See also ==
- History of the United States Navy
- List of inactive United States Navy aircraft squadrons
- List of United States Navy aircraft squadrons
