= COVID-19 pandemic in the Guantanamo Bay Naval Base =

- Disease: COVID-19
- Pathogen: SARS-CoV-2
- Location: Guantanamo Bay Naval Base
- Arrival date: 24 March 2020 (6 years, 1 month, 3 weeks and 3 days)
- Confirmed cases: 2
- Recovered: 2
- Deaths: 0

The COVID-19 pandemic was confirmed to have reached the United States' Guantanamo Bay Naval Base in March 2020. Since April 2020, the United States Department of Defense has directed bases to not publicize case statistics.

== Timeline ==
=== March 24 ===
On 24 March, the first case in Guantanamo Bay Naval Base was confirmed. It was announced that day that a navy sailor tested positive for the virus.

=== March 25 ===
On March 25, the schools at the Guantanamo Bay Naval Base moved to distance learning in order to help prevent the spread of COVID-19.

=== April 15 ===
After initial precautions were introduced on March 24, Joint Task Force Guantanamo Bay issued an updated series of procedures to prevent illness from spreading to any residents, stationed personnel, or detainees at the Guantanamo Bay Base. These rules included a mandatory quarantine of two weeks following arrival on the installation.

=== May 2 ===
Due to prohibitions on direct contact and travel due to the pandemic, lawyers and others plan to video-chat with the five defendants on trial in the United States v. Khalid Sheikh Mohammed case, one of the trials related to the September 11 attacks. Several defendants, including Khalid Sheikh Mohammed, Walid bin Attash, Ramzi bin al-Shibh, Ammar al-Baluchi, and Mustafa Ahmad al Hawsawi, retained lawyers considered at risk by the U.S. Department of Defense or were considered at-risk themselves, preventing direct communication. Regular quarterly visits are set to resume by August.

=== May 28 ===
On May 28 a group of 15 U.S. Senators, including prominent senators Bernie Sanders (I) and Elizabeth Warren (D), wrote a letter expressing their concern that there would be a significant outbreak of COVID-19 on the Guantanamo Bay Naval Base.

== Impact ==
=== On health care ===
The Guantanamo Bay Naval Base has a small hospital on its grounds. The hospital has been administering temperature checks, and sending some samples to the U.S. government to test. The prisoners at the Guantanamo Bay Naval Base are unable to enter the U.S. for healthcare, so the Pentagon sends out medical teams for serious treatments. The military has said that they have not tested any of the prisoners, because none of them met the CDC guidelines for testing. They have also refused to state how many have been tested, as to not "jeopardize operations." It is unclear whether or not there are any working ventilators at the Guantanamo Bay Naval Base.

=== On at risk populations ===
The detainee population of the Guantanamo Bay Naval Base ranges in age from mid-30s to 72 years old. Older prisoners with underlying health conditions like heart conditions and diabetes have been moved away from younger prisoners.

=== On education ===
W.T. Sampson Elementary/High School on the Guantanamo Bay Naval Base moved to distance learning on March 25, and was the last Department of Defense Education Activity (DODEA) school to do so. Classes for students continue online through Google Classroom.

It is unknown whether the 8 seniors at the school had been able to gather for their June 5 graduation.
