= Camp Justice (Guantanamo) =

American military court structure in Cuba

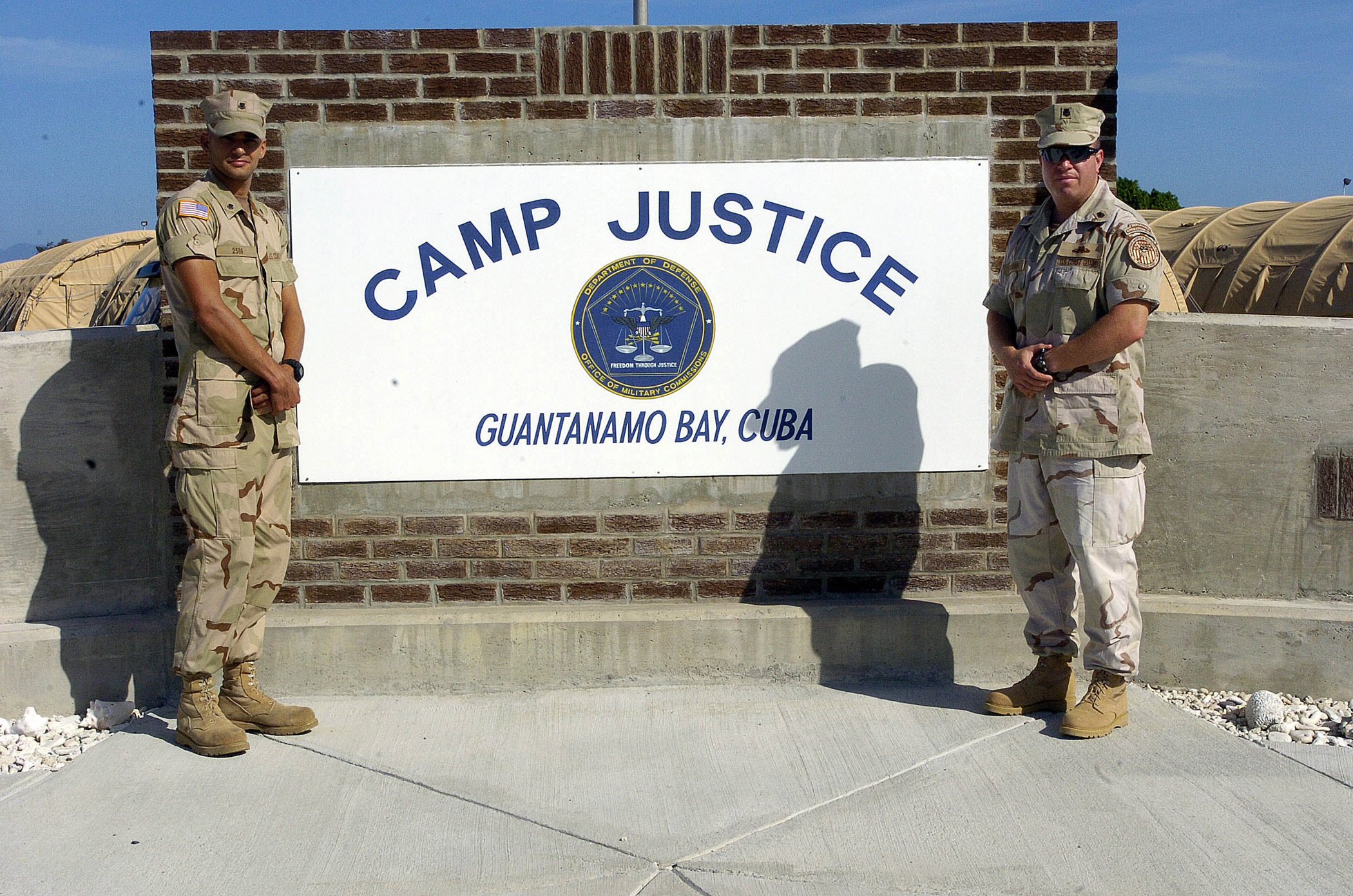
Camp Justice in 2009

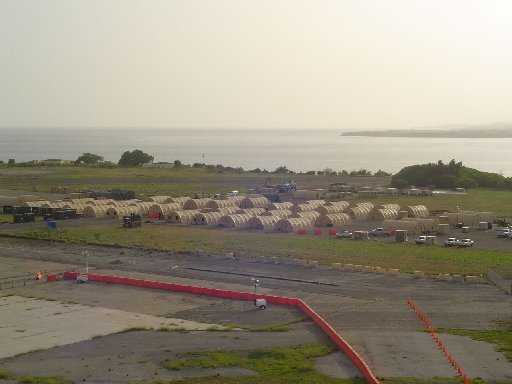
Tents where visiting lawyers, human rights observers, and reporters were to stay, when watching or participating in the military commissions

Camp Justice is the name given to the portion of the Guantanamo Bay Naval Base where the Guantanamo military commissions are held. It was named by TSgt Neil Felver of the 122 Civil Engineering Squadron in a name the camp contest. Initially the complex was to be a permanent facility, costing over $100 million. The United States Congress overruled the Bush administration's plans. Now the camp will be a portable, temporary facility, costing approximately $10 million.

On 2 January 2008, Toronto Star reporter Michelle Shephard offered an account of the security precautions reporters go through before they can attend the hearings:

- Reporters were not allowed to bring in more than one pen;
- Female reporters were frisked if they wore underwire bras;
- Reporters were not allowed to bring in their traditional coil-ring notepads;
- The bus bringing reporters to the hearing room is checked for explosives before it leaves;
- 200 meters (660 ft) from the hearing room reporters exit the bus, pass through metal detectors, and are sniffed by chemical detectors for signs of exposure to explosives;
- Only eight reporters are allowed into the hearing room—the remainder watch over closed circuit TV;

On 1 November 2008, David McFadden of the Associated Press stated the 100 tents erected to hold lawyers, reporters and observers for the military commissions were practically deserted when he and two other reporters covered Ali Hamza al-Bahlul's military commission in late October 2008.
