= Guantanamo Bay Naval Base =

Military base of the United States Navy

Naval Station Guantanamo Bay
- Leeward Point Field
- Guantánamo Bay in Cuba
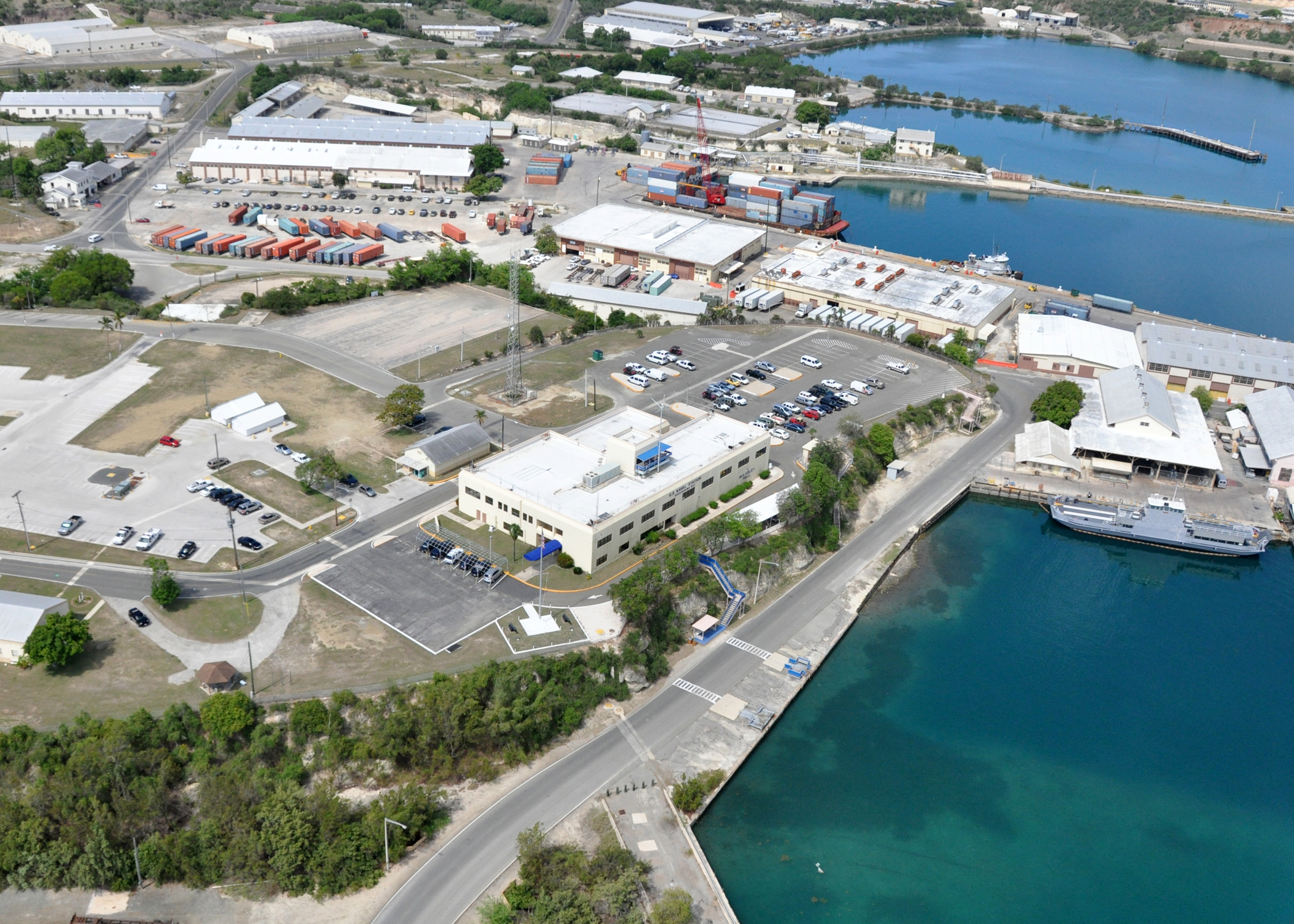
- Aerial view of Bulkeley Hall, the headquarters and administration building at Guantanamo Bay Naval Base

Site information
- Type: United States military base
- Owner: Government of Cuba (de jure); U.S. federal government (de facto)
- Operator: United States Navy
- Controlled by: Navy Region Southeast
- Condition: Operational
- Website: cnrse.cnic.navy.mil/Installations/NS-Guantanamo-Bay/

Location
- Location of Guantanamo Bay Naval Base in Cuba
- Coordinates: 19°55′03″N 75°09′36″W

Site history
- Built: 1903; 123 years ago
- In use: 1903 – present

Garrison information
- Current commander: Captain Mike "Heavin'" Stephen
- Garrison: Joint Task Force Guantanamo

Airfield information
- Identifiers: IATA: NBW, ICAO: MUGM, WMO: 783670
- Elevation: 17 meters (56 ft) AMSL
Runways
Direction	Length and surface
10/28	2,438 meters (7,999 ft) Asphalt

Guantanamo Bay Naval Base (Spanish: Base Naval de la Bahía de Guantánamo), officially known as Naval Station Guantanamo Bay or NSGB, (also called GTMO, pronounced Gitmo /ˈɡɪtmoʊ/ GIT-moh as jargon by the U.S. military) is a United States military base located on 45 square miles (117 km^{2}) of land and water on the shore of Guantánamo Bay at the southeastern end of Cuba. It has been de facto extraterritoriality of the U.S. since 1903 as a coaling station and naval base. It is the oldest overseas American naval base. Since 1974, the U.S. has paid the Cuban government an annual sum equivalent to $4,085 in 1934 dollars (approximately $98,314 in 2025) to lease the bay. The lease was previously $2,000 per year (paid in gold) until 1934, when it was set to match the value of gold in dollars.

Since taking power in 1959, the Cuban government has consistently protested against the U.S. presence on Cuban soil, arguing that the base was imposed on Cuba by force and is illegal under international law. The lease requires either bilateral consent or full U.S. military withdrawal in order to be terminated. Since 2002, the naval base has maintained the Guantanamo Bay detention camp for alleged unlawful combatants captured in Afghanistan, Iraq, and other places during the war on terror. Cases of alleged torture of prisoners by the U.S. military and their denial of protection under the Geneva Conventions have been criticized. The base has been a focal point for debates over civil liberties, notably influenced by the landmark 2008 Supreme Court decision in Boumediene v. Bush. This ruling affirmed the constitutional right of detainees to challenge their detention via habeas corpus, highlighting the ongoing tensions between national security and civil liberties.

== Geography ==
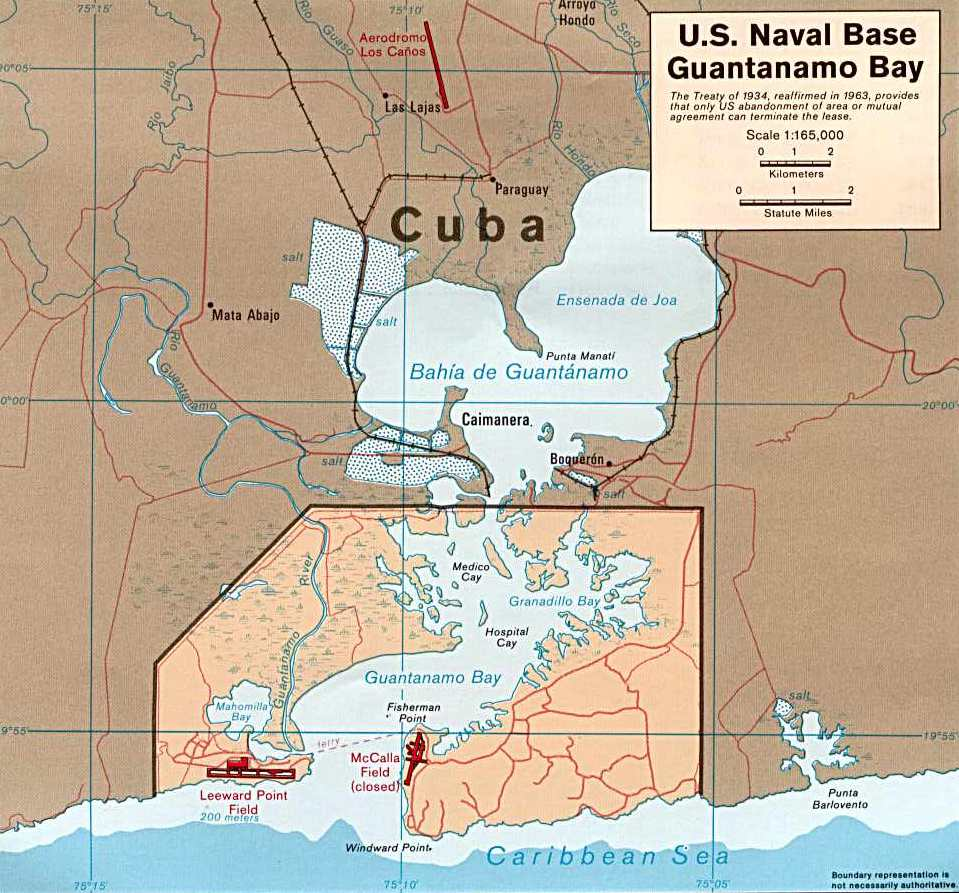
Map of Guantánamo Bay showing approximate U.S. Naval Base boundaries

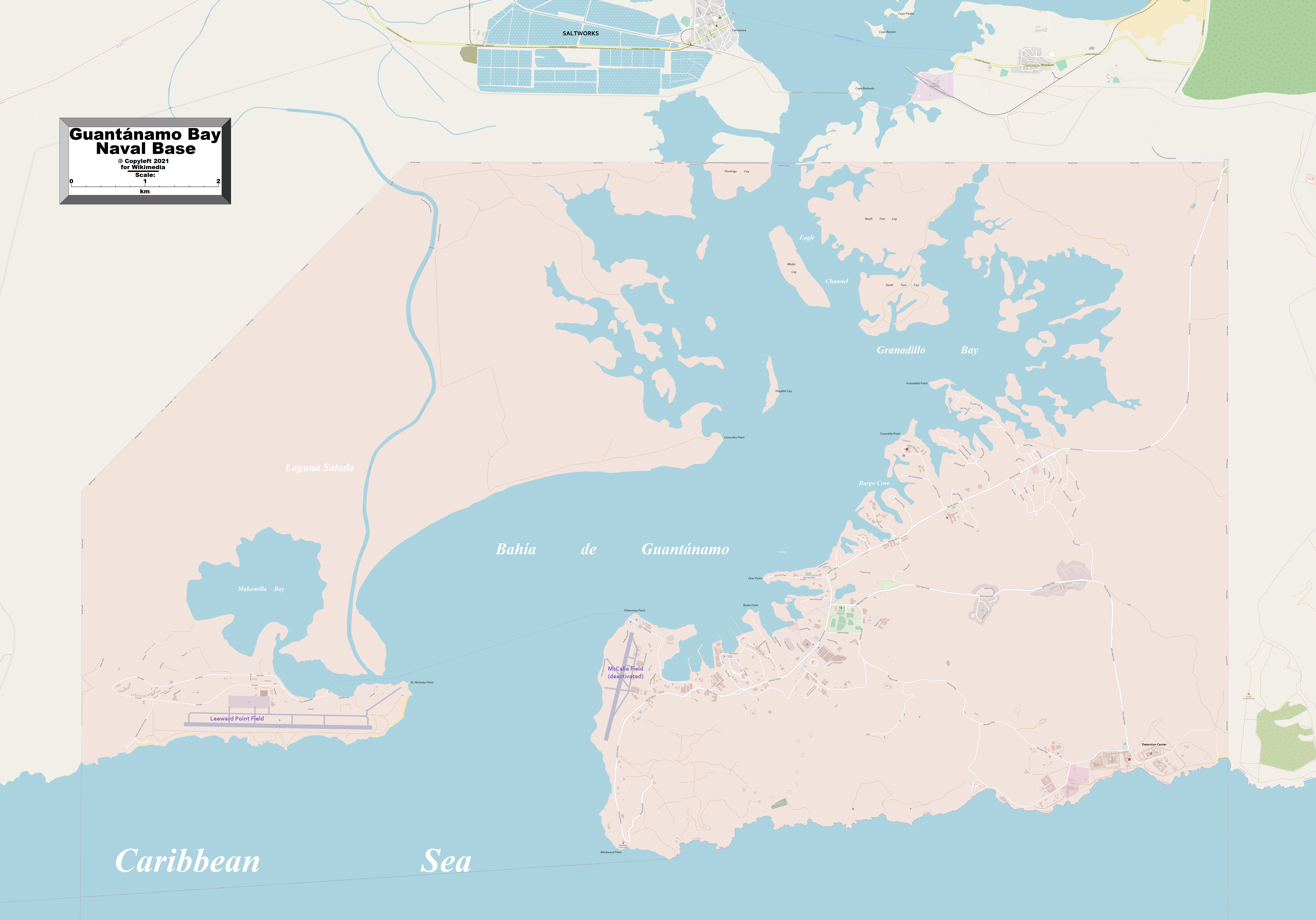
Enlargeable, detailed map of Guantánamo Bay Naval Base

The naval base occupies three main geographical sections: Leeward Point, Windward Point, and Guantánamo Bay. Guantánamo Bay physically divides the naval station into sections. The bay extends past the boundaries of the base into Cuba, where the bay is then referred to as Bahía de Guantánamo. Guantánamo Bay contains several cays, which are identified as Hospital Cay, Medico Cay, North Toro Cay, and South Toro Cay.

Leeward Point contains the airfield. Major geographical features on Leeward Point include Mohomilla Bay and the Guantánamo River. Three beaches exist at Leeward Point. Two are available for use by base residents, while the third, Hicacal Beach, is closed. Nearby is the US Naval Cemetery at Guantanamo Bay, also known as Cuzco Wells Cemetery. The cemetery holds over 350 burials, including that of Captain Henry Smith, who died as a result of injuries received during the sinking of his ship, the SS Delmundo, by the German submarine U-600 on 13 August 1942.

Windward Point contains most of the activities at the naval station. There are nine beaches available to base personnel. The highest point on the base is John Paul Jones Hill (named after the Revolutionary War hero) at 495 feet (151 m). There are many coves and peninsulas along the bay shoreline providing ideal areas for mooring ships. According to Stephen Benz, Stephen Crane described the area as "craggy" and "cut with ravines." He also described the coastline as covered in ridges and "chalky cliffs".

== History ==
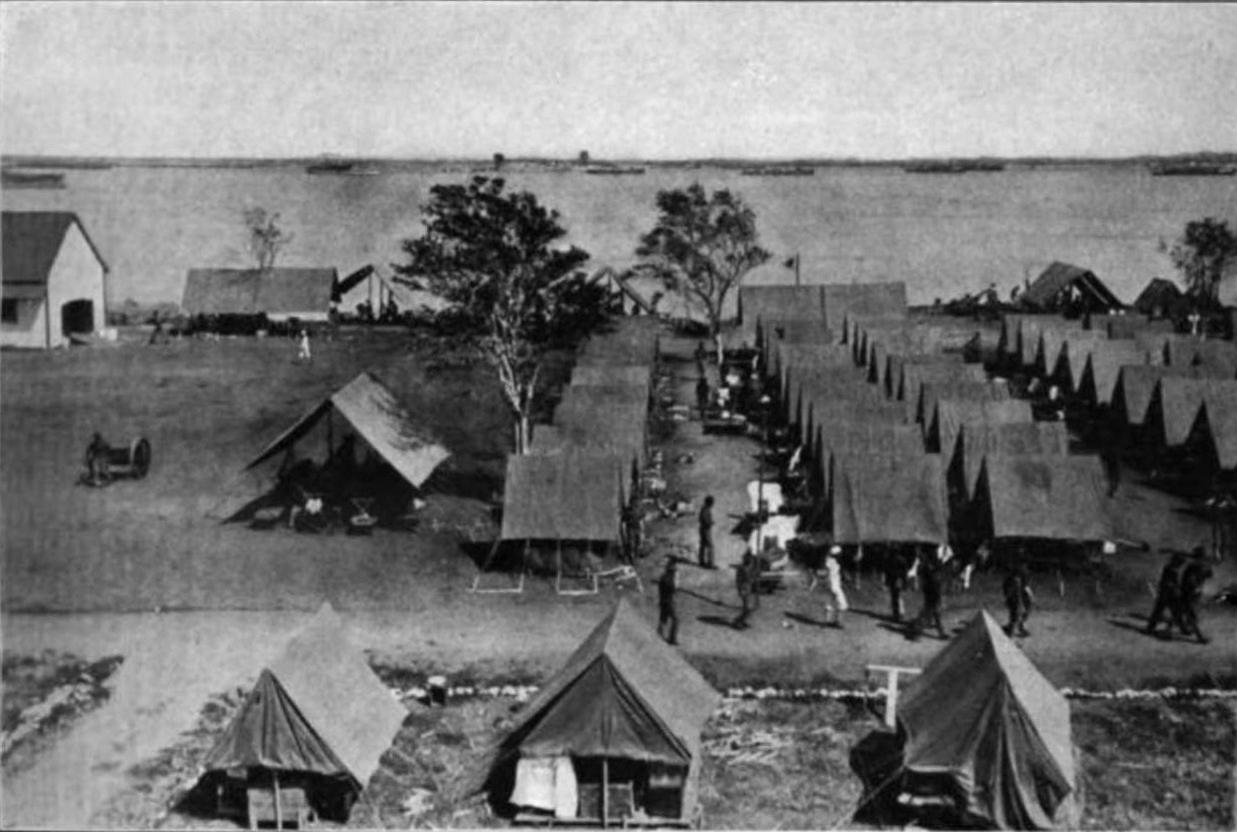
The base in 1916

=== Spanish colonial era ===
The area surrounding Guantanamo Bay was originally inhabited by the Taíno people. On 30 April 1494, Christopher Columbus, on his second voyage, arrived and spent the night. The place where Columbus landed is now known as Fisherman's Point. Columbus declared the bay Puerto Grande. The bay and surrounding areas briefly came under British control during the War of Jenkins' Ear. Prior to the outbreak of the conflict, the bay was referred to as Walthenham Harbor by British cartographers. The British expeditionary force renamed the bay Cumberland Bay. They eventually retreated from the area after an attempt to march to Santiago de Cuba was repulsed by Spanish troops.

=== Spanish–American War ===
During the Spanish–American War, the U.S. fleet attacking Santiago secured Guantánamo's harbor for protection during the hurricane season of 1898. Marines landed at Guantanamo Bay with naval support, and American and Cuban forces routed the defending Spanish troops. There is a monument on McCalla Hill to one Navy officer and five Marines who died in the Battle of Guantánamo Bay.

The war ended with the Treaty of Paris of 1898, in which Spain formally relinquished control of Cuba. Although the war was over, the United States maintained a strong military presence on the island. In 1901 the United States government passed the Platt Amendment as part of an Army Appropriations Bill. Section VII of this amendment reads:

That to enable the United States to maintain the independence of Cuba, and to protect the people thereof, as well as for its own defense, the government of Cuba will sell or lease to the United States lands necessary for coaling or naval stations at certain specified points to be agreed upon with the President of the United States.

After initial resistance by the Cuban Constitutional Convention, the Platt Amendment was incorporated into the Constitution of the Republic of Cuba in 1901. The constitution took effect in 1902, and land for a naval base at Guantanamo Bay was granted to the United States the following year.

=== Permanent lease ===
Agreement for the lease to the United States of lands in Cuba for coaling and naval stations
- Signed: 16 February 1903; 23 February 1903
- Location: Havana; Washington
- Effective: 23 February 1903
- Signatories: Cuba; United States
- Citations: TS 418; 6 Bevans 1113

Agreement providing conditions for the lease of coaling or naval stations
- Signed: 2 July 1903
- Location: Havana
- Effective: 6 October 1903
- Signatories: Cuba; United States
- Citations: TS 426; 6 Bevans 1120

The 1903 lease agreement, which has no fixed expiration date, was executed in two parts. The first, signed in February, consists of the following provisions:

1. Agreement – The United States of America and the Republic of Cuba, desiring to maintain the Independence of Cuba, will enter into a lease for lands necessary for US Naval Stations.
2. Article 1 – Describes the boundaries of the areas being leased, Guantanamo Bay and Bahia Honda.
3. Article 2 – The U.S. may occupy, use, and modify the properties to fit the needs of a coaling and naval station, only. Vessels in the Cuban trade shall have free passage.
4. Article 3 – Cuba retains ultimate sovereignty, but during the occupation, the U.S. exercises sole jurisdiction over the areas described in Article 1. Under conditions to be agreed on, the U.S. has the right to acquire, by purchase or eminent domain, any land included therein.

The second part, signed five months later in July 1903, consists of the following provisions:

1. Article 1 – Payment is $2,000 gold coin, annually. All private lands within the boundaries shall be acquired by Cuba. The U.S. will advance rental payments to Cuba to facilitate those purchases.
2. Article 2 – The U.S. shall pay for a survey of the sites and mark the boundaries with fences.
3. Article 3 – There will be no commercial or other enterprise within the leased areas.
4. Article 4 – Mutual extradition.
5. Article 5 – Not ports of entry.
6. Article 6 – Ships shall be subject to Cuban port police. The U.S. will not obstruct entry or departure into the bay.
7. Article 7 – This proposal is open for seven months.

SIGNED Theodore Roosevelt and Jose M Garcia Montes.

In 1934, the United States unilaterally changed the payment from gold coin to U.S. dollars per the Gold Reserve Act. The lease amount was set at US$3,386.25, based on the price of gold at the time. In 1973, the U.S. adjusted the lease amount to $3,676.50, and in 1974 to $4,085, based on further increases to the price of gold in USD. Payments have been sent annually, but only one lease payment has been accepted since the Cuban Revolution, and Fidel Castro claimed that this check was deposited due to confusion in 1959. The Cuban government has not deposited any other lease check since that time.

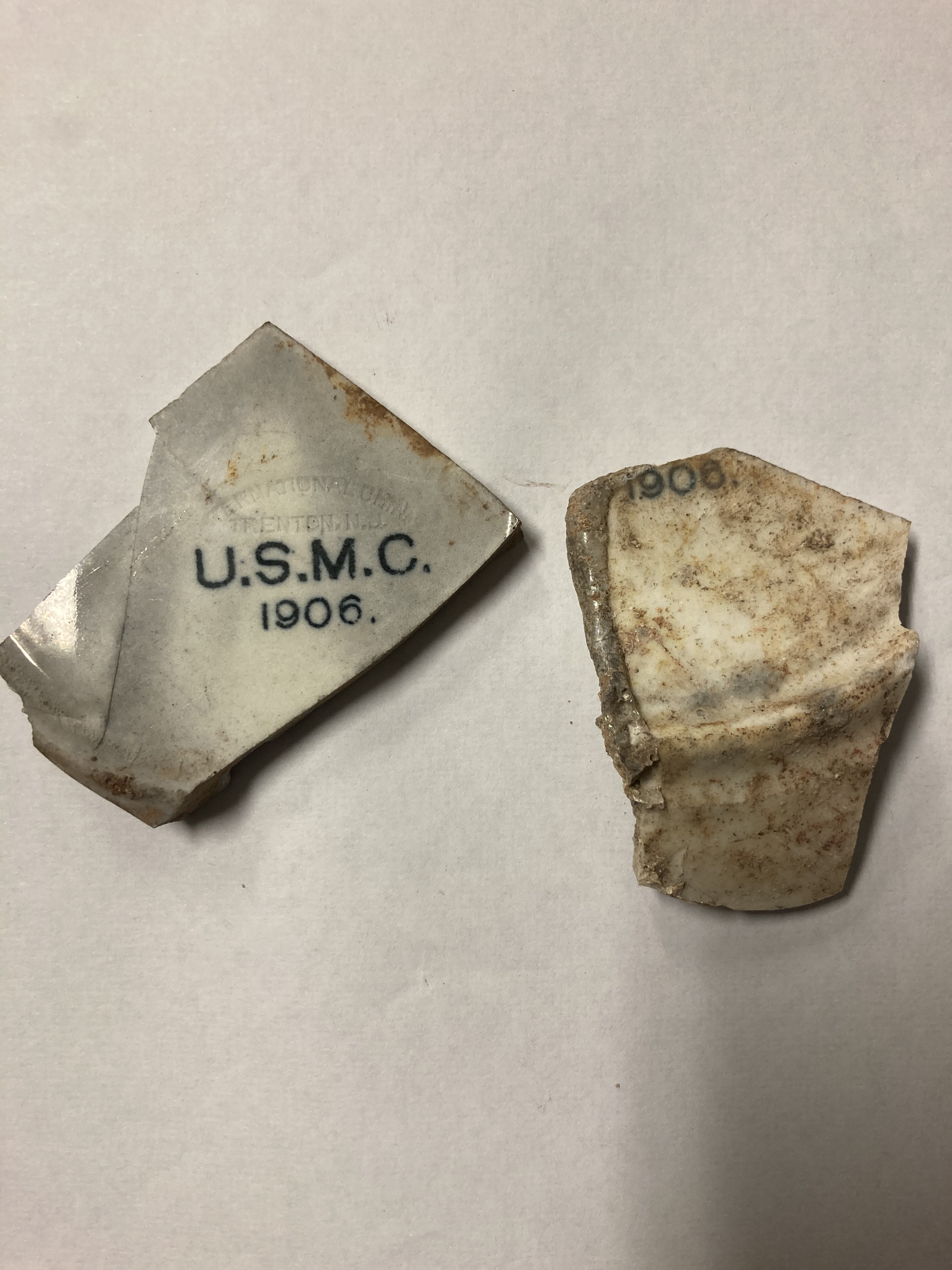
Shards from 1906

=== Before and during World War II ===
The naval base became a prime area for winter training for the Atlantic fleet. Due to the large increase in population during the training months, the base quickly established facilities to support everyday functions. Construction of the Guantanamo Bay fleet range system began as early as 1905, with four primary ranges. Due to the size of the base, sections were shut down in order for range operations to proceed. Ironically, the concrete range system's size and cost led to its downfall. Evidence suggests the fleet ranges were used throughout World War I and the beginning of World War II.

During World War II, the base was set up to use a nondescript number for postal operations. The base used the Fleet Post Office, Atlantic, in New York City, with the address: 115 FPO NY. The base was also an important intermediate distribution point for merchant shipping convoys from New York City and Key West, Florida, to the Panama Canal and the islands of Puerto Rico, Jamaica, and Trinidad and Tobago.

=== Cold War and beyond ===
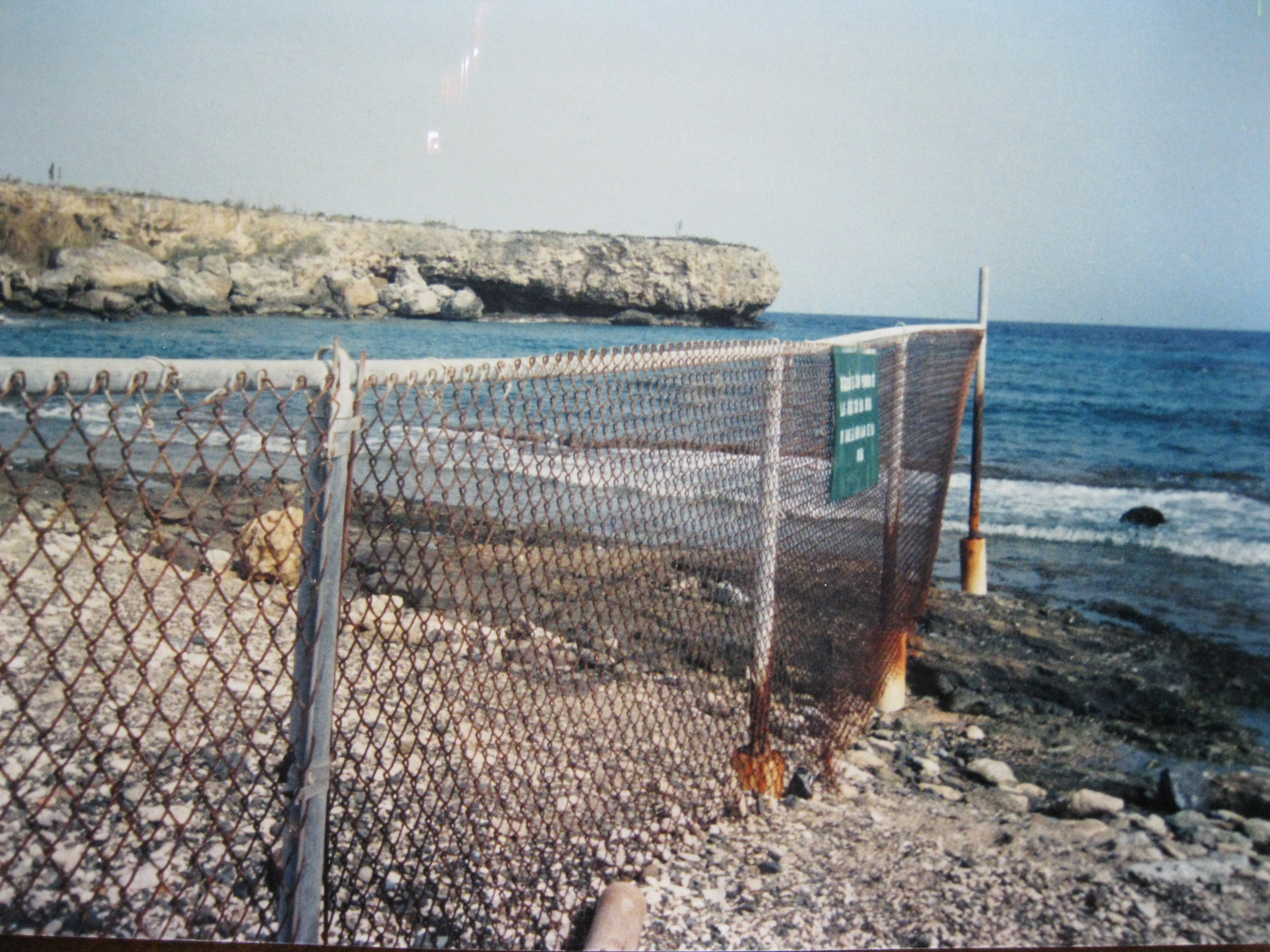
United States base–Cuban border, Guantanamo Bay Naval Base, 2011

Guantanamo Bay Naval Base in about 1952

From 1953 to 1959, thousands of Cubans commuted daily from outside the base to jobs within it. In mid-1958, vehicular traffic was stopped; workers were required to walk through the base's several gates. Public Works Center buses were pressed into service almost overnight to carry workers to and from the gate.

The "Cactus Curtain" is a term describing the line separating the naval base from Cuban-controlled territory, an allusion to Europe's Iron Curtain, the Bamboo Curtain in East Asia, and the similar Ice Curtain in the Bering Strait. After the Cuban Revolution, some Cubans sought refuge on the Guantanamo Bay Naval Base. In late 1961, Cuban troops planted an 8-mile (13 km)-long, 10-foot (3 m)-wide barrier of Opuntia (prickly pear) cactus along the northeastern section of the 17-mile (27 km) fence surrounding the base, to prevent checkpoint evasion when moving between the base and Cuba proper.

The curtain forms part of a "no man's land" that encircles the base. This area contains perimeter patrols, outposts featuring sandbags and watchtowers, and has been complemented with barbed wire fences, mine fields, and cacti. Apart from the cacti, both U.S. and Cuban troops erected, maintained, and otherwise manned these defenses, primarily to prevent checkpoint evasion and possible invasion from the other side.

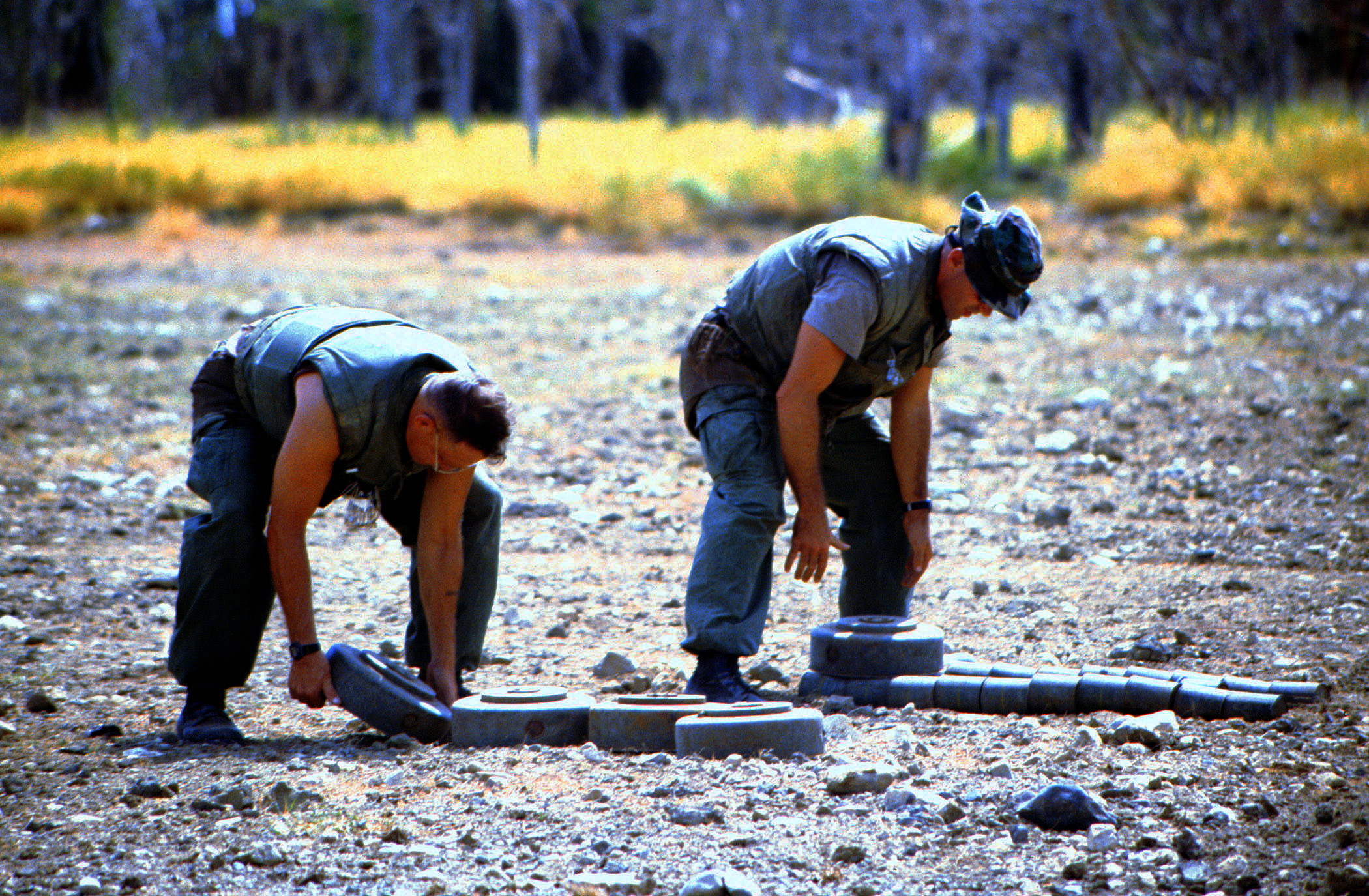
U.S. Marines stack up landmines for disposal, July 1997.

U.S. and Cuban troops placed some 55,000 anti-personnel and anti-tank land mines across the "no man's land" around the perimeter of the base, creating the second-largest minefield in the world, and the largest in the Western Hemisphere. Initially, the mines were laid down by US troops, who also posted signs stating that the landmines were "precautions" and should not be viewed as "aggressive". In response, Cuban troops also laid down their own mines, with both sides completing their minefields in 1961. Between 1961 and 1965, landmine explosions resulted in the deaths of at least 10 people, including as the result of engineering accidents and late-night partygoers. On 16 May 1996, U.S. President Bill Clinton ordered the demining of the American field. The mines have since been replaced with motion and sound sensors to detect intruders on the base. The Cuban government has not removed its corresponding minefield outside the perimeter.

During the Cuban Missile Crisis in 1962, the families of military personnel were evacuated from the base. Notified of the evacuation on 22 October, evacuees were told to pack one suitcase per family member, to bring evacuation and immunization cards, to tie pets in the yard, to leave the keys to the house on the dining table, and to wait in front of the house for buses. Dependents traveled to the airfield for flights to the United States, or to ports for passage aboard evacuation ships. After the crisis was resolved, family members were allowed to return to the base in December 1962.

From 1939, the base's water was supplied by pipelines that drew water from the Yateras River about 4.5 miles (7 km) northeast of the base, for which the U.S. government paid a fee. In 1964, the cost was about $14,000 per month for about 2.5 million U.S. gal (9 million L) per day. In 1964, the Cuban government stopped the flow. The base had about 14 million U.S. gal (50 million L) of water in storage, and strict water conservation measures were put into effect immediately. Initially, the U.S. imported water from Jamaica by barge, but then relocated a desalination plant from San Diego (Point Loma). When the Cuban government accused the United States of "stealing water", base commander John D. Bulkeley ordered the pipelines cut and a section removed. A 38 in (97 cm) length of the 14 in (36 cm) diameter pipe and a 20 in (51 cm) length of the 10 in (25 cm) diameter pipe were lifted from the ground and the openings sealed.

During the 1960s and 1970s, the base had problems with alcohol and racial tension. Harassment and strip searches also became a regular occurrence for Cuban workers on the base. By 2006, only two elderly Cubans, Luis Delarosa and Harry Henry, still crossed the base's North East Gate daily to work on the base, because the Cuban government has prohibited new recruitment since 1959. Both men retired at the end of 2012.

Several old guns from the USS Monongahela (1862) have been salvaged and placed around the base. The warship served as a storeship at Guantanamo until destroyed by fire on 17 March 1908. A 4-inch (100 mm) gun was salvaged from its wreck and put on display. Since the gun was deformed by the heat from the fire, it was nicknamed "Ole Droopy". A similar gun, possibly also salvaged from the Monongahela, is on display near the Bay View Club.

The base’s territorial status has occasionally been compared to a Sovereign base (notably the British bases in Cyprus), though it differs in that it is lease-based rather than retained sovereignty.

At the United Nations Human Rights Council in 2013, Cuba's Foreign Minister demanded the U.S. return the base to Cuba.

== Current operations ==
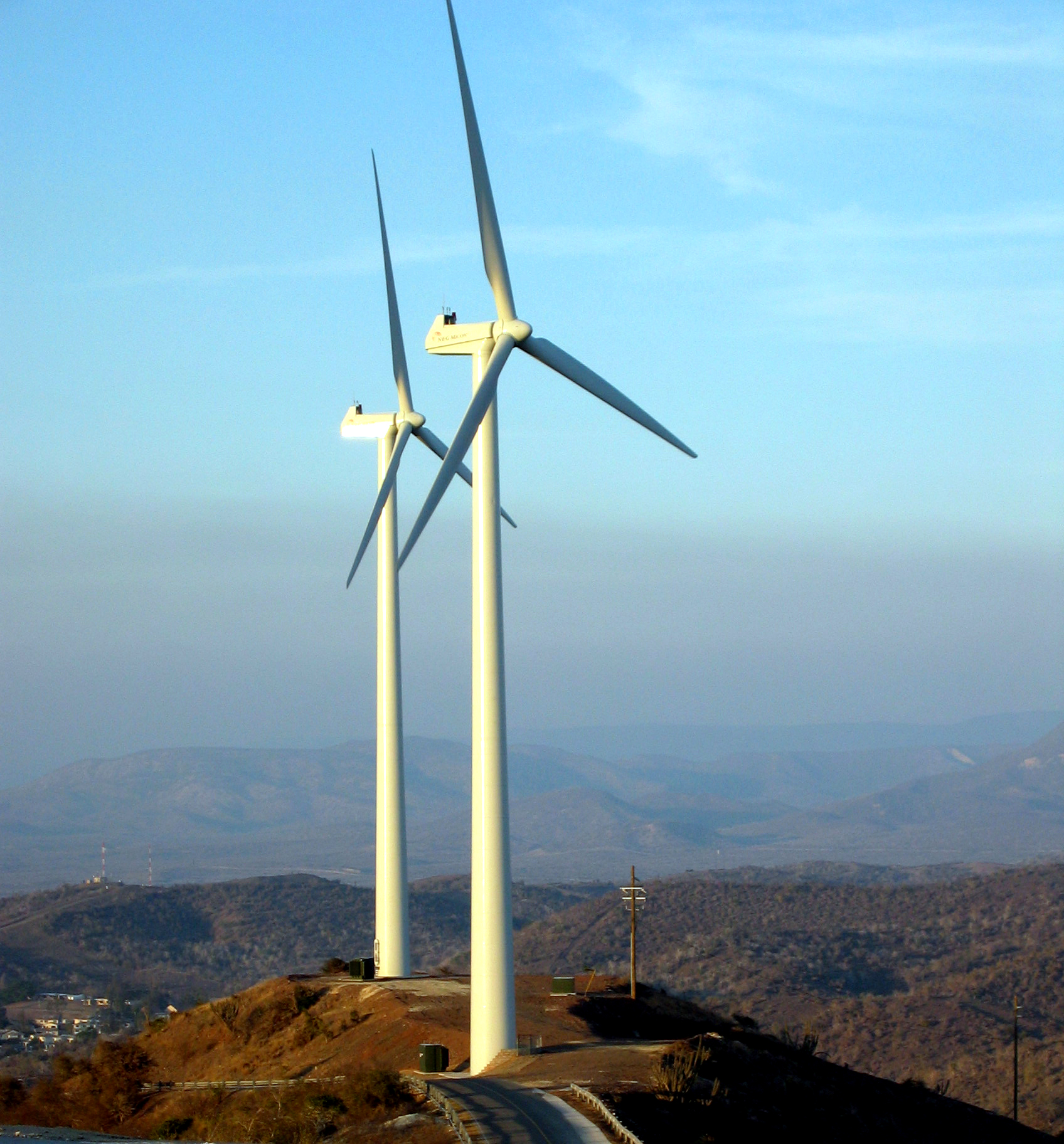
Wind turbines atop John Paul Jones Hill, the highest point on the base

The military facility has a population of about 6,100, including military personnel, civilian employees, and family members. It is the only military base the U.S. maintains in a socialist country.

In 2005, the U.S. Navy completed a $12 million wind-power project at the base, erecting four 950 kilowatt, 275-foot tall (84 m) wind turbines, reducing the reliance on diesel fuel to power the existing diesel generators (the base's primary electricity generation). In 2006, the wind turbines reduced diesel fuel consumption by 650,000 US gallons (2,500 m^{3}) annually.

=== Units and commands ===
Access to the naval station is very limited and must be pre-approved through the appropriate local chain of command with the commander of the station as the final approval. Since berthing facilities are limited, visitors must be sponsored indicating that they have an approved residence for the duration of the visit.

Resident units

- Headquarters, Naval Station Guantanamo Bay
- Customer Service Desk
- Joint Task Force Guantanamo
  - Headquarters, JTF Guantanamo
  - Joint Detention Group
  - Joint Intelligence Group
  - Joint Medical Group
  - U.S. Coast Guard Maritime Security Detachment Guantanamo Bay
  - AFN Guantanamo Bay radio and television unit
- Marine Corps Security Force Company
- Naval Computer and Telecommunications Area Master Station Atlantic Detachment Guantanamo Bay
- Naval Hospital Guantanamo Bay
- Navy Supply
- Navy Security Forces
- Seabee Detachment
- U.S. Coast Guard Aviation Detachment Guantanamo Bay

Assigned units

- Fleet Composite Squadron Ten (VC-10) (1965–1993)
- U.S. Marine Corps Ground Defense Force (1971–2000 [Redesignated as Marine Corps Security Forces Company on 1 Sep 2000])
- Naval Security Group Activity (Company L) (1966–2001)
- Shore Intermediate Maintenance Activity (SIMA) (1903–1995)
- Fleet Training Group (1943–1995)

Homeported watercraft

- YC 1639 (open lighter)
- Leeward (YFB-92) (ferry boat)
- Windward (YFB-93) (ferry boat)
- YON 258 (non-self propelled fuel oil barge)
- USS Wanamassa (YTB-820) (large harbor tug)
- LCU 1671 and MK-8: landing craft used as an alternate ferry for transportation to areas inaccessible by the primary ferry and for moving hazardous cargo.
- GTMO-5, GTMO-6 and GTMO-7 (50-ft. utility boats): used for personnel transportation during off-ferry hours.

Civilian contractors

Besides servicemembers, the base houses a large number of civilian contractors working for the military. Many of these contractors are migrant workers from Jamaica and the Philippines, and are thought to constitute up to 40% of the base's population.

Major contractors working at the base have included the following:

- KBR
- Schuyler Line Navigation Company
- Satellite Communication Systems Incorporated
- Centerra
- EMCOR
- Islands Mechanical Contractor
- Munilla Construction Management
- RQ Construction
- MCM Construction
- J&J Worldwide Services

=== Cargo shipping ===
Ocean transportation is provided by Schuyler Line Navigation Company, a U.S. Flag Ocean Carrier. Schuyler Line operates under government contract to supply sustainment and building supplies to the base.

=== Airfields ===
There are two airfields within the base, Leeward Point Field and McCalla Field. Leeward Point Field is the active military airfield, with the ICAO code MUGM and IATA code NBW. McCalla Field was designated as the auxiliary landing field in 1970s but was no longer a viable airfield by the 1990s.

Leeward Point Field was constructed with a 6,000-foot main runway in 1943; the runway was extended in 1953 to 8,000 feet to accommodate jet aircraft. The field has a single active runway, 10/28, measuring 8,000 ft (2,400 m). The former runway, 9/27 was 8,500 ft (2,600 m). Currently, the airfield operates several aircraft and helicopters supporting base operations. Leeward Point Field was home to Fleet Composite Squadron 10 (VC-10) until the unit was phased out in 1993. VC-10 was one of the last active-duty squadrons flying the Douglas A-4 Skyhawk.

McCalla Field was established in 1931 and remained operational until 1970. The airfield was named for Bowman H. McCalla, who was an admiral in charge of the Battle of Guantánamo Bay. The current field was expanded in 1941 when the original grass runway was replaced. Aircraft routinely operating out of McCalla included JRF-5, N3N, J2F, C-1 Trader, and dirigibles. The airfield was deactivated in the 1970s and was used to house Cuban and Haitian refugees beginning in the 1990s. Sometime between 1996 and 2001, the refugee camps were dismantled, and the area became a collection of abandoned buildings. McCalla Field is now listed as a closed airfield. After the events of September 11, the area was reevaluated as a possible location for a detention facility. Camp Justice is now located on the grounds of the former airfield. The area formerly consisted of three runways, all now closed: 1/19 at 4,500 ft (1,400 m), 14/32 at 2,210 ft (670 m), and 10/28 at 1,850 ft (560 m).

=== Detention camp ===
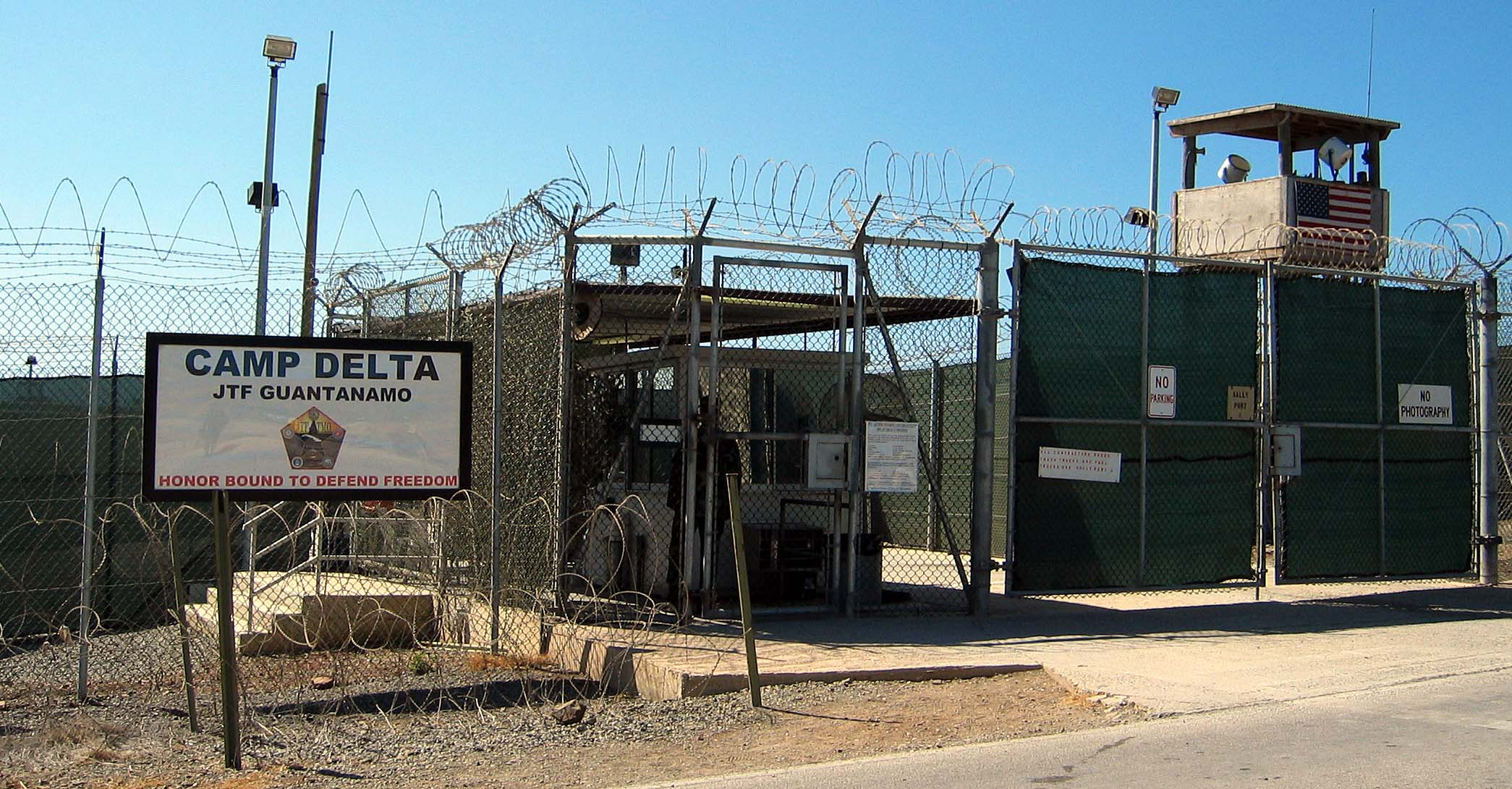
The entrance to Camp 1 in detention camp's Camp Delta

Beginning in the last quarter of the 20th century, the base was used to house Cuban and Haitian refugees intercepted on the high seas. In the early 1990s, it held refugees who fled Haiti after military forces overthrew President Jean-Bertrand Aristide. These refugees were held in a detainment area called Camp Bulkeley until United States district court Judge Sterling Johnson, Jr. declared the camp unconstitutional. This decision was later vacated. The last Haitian migrants departed Guantanamo in November 1995.

Beginning in 2002, following the U.S. invasion of Afghanistan, a small portion of the base was used to detain several hundred individuals with ties or suspected ties to Islamic terrorist groups such as al-Qaeda and the Taliban. These detainees were not afforded POW status or facing formal charges but instead were designated enemy combatants; assigned to confinement in Camp Delta, Camp Echo, Camp Iguana, and the temporary Camp X-Ray. In litigation regarding the availability of fundamental rights to those imprisoned at the base, the U.S. Supreme Court has recognized that the detainees "have been imprisoned in territory over which the United States exercises exclusive jurisdiction and control." Therefore, the detainees have the fundamental right to due process of law under the Fifth Amendment. A district court has since held that the "Geneva Conventions applied to the Taliban detainees, but not to members of Al-Qaeda terrorist organization."

On 10 June 2006, the Department of Defense reported that three Guantanamo Bay detainees took their own lives. The military reported the men hanged themselves with nooses made of sheets and clothes. A study published by Seton Hall Law's Center for Policy and Research, while making no conclusions regarding what actually transpired, asserts that the military investigation failed to address significant issues detailed in that report.

On 6 September 2006, President George W. Bush announced that alleged or non-alleged combatants held by the CIA would be transferred to the custody of Department of Defense, and held at Guantanamo Prison. Of approximately 500 prisoners in Guantanamo Bay, only 10 had been tried by the Guantanamo military commission, but all cases had been stayed pending adjustments made to comply with the U.S. Supreme Court decision in Hamdi v. Rumsfeld.

In January 2009, President Barack Obama signed an executive order directing the closing of the Guantánamo detention camp within one year. This plan was scrapped in May, when the United States Senate voted to keep the prison at Guantanamo Bay open for the foreseeable future and forbid the transfer of any detainees to facilities in the United States. Senator Daniel Inouye, a Democrat from Hawaii and chairman of the appropriations committee, said he favored keeping Guantanamo open until Obama produced a "coherent plan for closing the prison." In March 2011, Obama issued an executive order permitting indefinite detention of Guantánamo detainees. This decision was codified into federal law by provision added to the National Defense Authorization Act for Fiscal Year 2012.

In February 2021, the administration of U.S. President Joe Biden declared his intention to shut down the facility before he leaves office. He did not. In July 2021, a detainee was released. In June 2022, an Afghan prisoner held at Guantanamo Bay for about 15 years without trial was released. In February 2023, three prisoners were released. Majid Khan, who pleaded guilty before a Military Commission in 2012, had completed his sentence of 10 years and was released to Belize. Brothers Abdul Al-Rahim Ghulam Rabbani and Mohammed Ahmad Ghulam Rabbani, whose detentions were deemed no longer necessary in order to protect the United States from a national security threat, were released and repatriated to the government of Pakistan. In March 2023, Ghassan al-Sharbi was released to his home country of Saudi Arabia after being deemed no longer necessary to detain in order to protect the United States from a national security threat. As of January 6, 2025, 15 detainees remain at Guantanamo Bay.

In June 2023, United Nations Special Rapporteur on Human Rights and Counter-Terrorism Fionnuala Ní Aoláin released her final report on the detention center. The report concludes that prisoners endure "ongoing cruel, inhuman, and degrading treatment" and that the detention center should be closed.

In early 2025, the Trump administration started sending numerous illegal aliens there, and the president has stated that he intends to send the worst criminal migrants to the prison. Multiple groups and people have filed lawsuits against this, claiming that the prisoners do not have access to a lawyer or habeas corpus, and that the prisoners' conditions were brutal enough that some have attempted suicide.

== Represented businesses ==
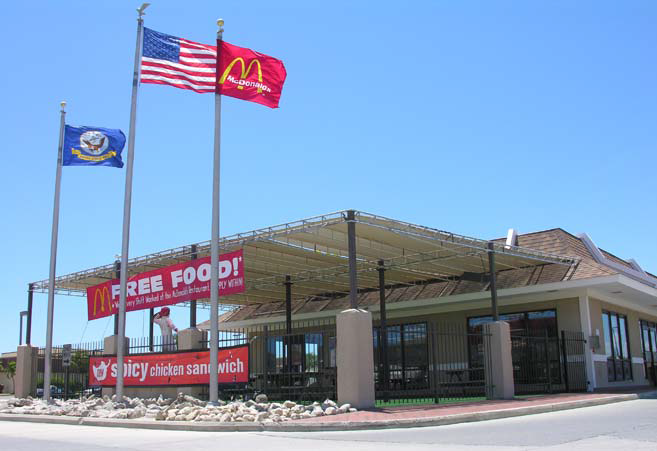
The Guantanamo McDonald's restaurant in 2006

Despite the prohibition on the establishment of "commercial or other enterprises" as stated in Article 3 of the second part of the lease, several recognized American food outlets have been opened at the military base. Most of the restaurants on the installation are franchises which are owned and operated by the Department of the Navy. Proceeds from these restaurants are used to support Morale, Welfare and Recreation activities for service personnel and their families. These restaurants are located inside the base; as such, they are not accessible to Cubans.

A Baskin-Robbins ice cream stand, which opened in the 1980s, was one of the first business franchises allowed on the base. In early 1986, the base added the first and only McDonald's restaurant within Cuba. A Subway restaurant was opened in 1987 and closed in 1994 when the Navy Department did not renew the lease. In 2004, a combined KFC and A&W restaurant was opened at the bowling alley, and a Pizza Hut Express was added to the Windjammer Restaurant. There is also a cafe that sells Starbucks coffee, and there is a combined KFC and Taco Bell restaurant.

== Education and schooling ==
Department of Defense Education Activity provides for the education of dependent personnel with two schools. Both schools are named for Rear Admiral William Thomas Sampson. W.T. Sampson Elementary School serves grades K–5 and W. T. Sampson High School serves grades 6–12. The Villamar Child Development Center provides child care for dependents from six weeks to five years old. MWR operates a Youth Center that provides activities for dependents.

Some former students of Guantánamo have shared stories of their experiences with the Guantánamo Public Memory Project. The 2013 documentary Guantanamo Circus directed by Christina Linhardt and Michael Rose reveals a glimpse of day-to-day life on GTMO as seen through the eyes of circus performers who visit the base. It is used as a reference by the Guantánamo Public Memory Project.

== Climate ==
The base has an annual rainfall of about 24 in (610 mm) and is classified as a semi-arid tropical savanna. The annual average high temperature on the base is 88.2 °F (31.2 °C), the annual average low is 72.5 °F (22.5 °C).

Climate data for Guantanamo Bay
Month	Jan	Feb	Mar	Apr	May	Jun	Jul	Aug	Sep	Oct	Nov	Dec	Year
Mean daily maximum °F (°C)	84 (29)	84 (29)	86 (30)	88 (31)	88 (31)	90 (32)	91 (33)	91 (33)	91 (33)	90 (32)	88 (31)	86 (30)	88.2 (31.2)
Mean daily minimum °F (°C)	68 (20)	68 (20)	70 (21)	72 (22)	73 (23)	75 (24)	75 (24)	75 (24)	75 (24)	75 (24)	73 (23)	70 (21)	72.5 (22.5)
Average precipitation inches (mm)	1.0 (25)	0.9 (23)	1.2 (30)	1.3 (33)	3.6 (91)	2.1 (53)	1.1 (28)	1.9 (48)	3.1 (80)	5.1 (130)	1.8 (46)	1.1 (28)	24.4 (620)
Source: Weatherbase

== Notable people ==
Notable people born at the naval base include actor Peter Bergman and guitarist Isaac Guillory.

== See also ==
- COVID-19 pandemic in the Guantanamo Bay Naval Base
- Cuba–United States relations
- A Few Good Men – a play by Aaron Sorkin, and later a film adaptation, about an unlawful hazing incident taking place amongst Marines at the naval base in 1986.
- The Road to Guantanamo – a docudrama directed by Michael Winterbottom about the incarceration of three British detainees at the naval base.
- Cuban–American Treaty of Relations
- Panama Canal Zone
- Pituffik Space Base, an American space base in Greenland with a similar lease agreement
- Miami Air International Flight 293, a flight that originated at Guantanamo Bay Naval Base and crashed at the destination
