= Cuban immigration to the United States =

Cuban immigration to the United States, for the most part, occurred in two periods: the first series of immigration of wealthy Cuban Americans to the United States resulted from Cubans establishing cigar factories in Tampa, Florida, and from attempts to overthrow Spanish colonial rule by the movement led by José Martí, the second to escape from communist rule under Fidel Castro following the Cuban Revolution. Massive Cuban migration to Miami during the second series led to major demographic and cultural changes in Miami. There was also economic emigration, particularly during the Great Depression in the 1930s. As of 2025, there were 1,799,047 Cuban immigrants in the United States.

The Louisiana Purchase and the Adams–Onís Treaty of 1819, Spanish Florida, including the present day state of Florida and, at times, Louisiana and adjoining territory, was a province of the Captaincy General of Cuba (Captain General being the Spanish title equivalent to the British colonial Governor). Consequently, Cuban immigration to the U.S. has a long history, beginning in the Spanish colonial period in 1565 when St. Augustine, Florida was established by Pedro Menéndez de Avilés, and hundreds of Spanish-Cuban soldiers and their families moved from Cuba to St. Augustine to establish a new life.

Thousands of Cuban settlers also immigrated to Louisiana between 1778 and 1802 and Texas during the period of Spanish rule. By 1820, the Cuban population in the United States consisted of more than 1,000 people in total. In 1870, the number of Cuban immigrants increased to almost 12,000, of whom 4,500 resided in New York City, 3,000 in New Orleans, and 2,000 in Key West. The causes of these movements were both economic and political, which intensified after 1860, when political factors played the predominant role in emigration, as a result of deteriorating relations with the Spain, the colonial power.

The year 1869 marked the beginning of one of the most significant periods of emigration from Cuba to the United States, again centered on Key West. People would often come over in rafts or weak and small boats. The exodus of hundreds of workers and businessmen was linked to the manufacture of tobacco. The reasons are many: the introduction of more modern techniques of elaboration of snuff, the most direct access to its main market, the United States, the uncertainty about the future of the island, which had suffered years of economic, political and social unrest during the beginning of the Ten Years' War against Spanish rule. It was an exodus of skilled workers, precisely the class in the island that had succeeded in establishing a free labor sector amid a slave economy.

The manufacture of snuff by the Cuban labor force, became the most important source of income for Key West between 1869 and 1900.

Tampa was added to such efforts, with a strong migration of Cubans, which went from 720 inhabitants in 1880 to 5,532 in 1890. However, the second half of the 1890s marked the decline of the Cuban immigrant population, as an important part of it returned to the island to fight for independence. The War accentuated Cuban immigrant integration into American society, whose numbers were significant: more than 12,000 people.

Statue of Jose Martí at the Circulo Cubano (Cuban Club), Ybor City

== Immigration to Key West and Tampa (1850-1889) ==
In the mid-to late 19th century, several cigar manufacturers moved their operations to Key West to get away from growing disruptions as Cubans sought independence from Spanish colonial rule. Many Cuban cigar workers followed. The Cuban government had even established a grammar school in Key West to help preserve Cuban culture. There, children learned folk songs and patriotic hymns such as "La Bayamesa", the Cuban national anthem.

In 1885, Vicente Martinez Ybor moved his cigar operations from Key West to the town of Tampa, Florida, to escape labor strife. Ybor City was designed as a modified company town, and it quickly attracted thousands of Cuban workers from Key West and Cuba with Spanish and Italian immigrant workers. West Tampa, another cigar manufacturing community, was founded nearby in 1892 and grew quickly. Between these communities, the Tampa Bay area's Cuban population grew from almost nothing to the largest in Florida in just over a decade, and the city as a whole grew from a village of 1,000 residents in 1885 to over 16,000 by 1900.

Alongside becoming a cigar manufacturing hub, the City Ybor developed into a cultural center for Cubans and other immigrants. The community evolved culturally by intermingling Cuban, Spanish, Italian, and other later immigrant cultures, making it distinct. Social clubs, newspapers, restaurants, and Cuban theaters contributed to Tampa's cultural life which burgeoned, and socialized in this area. Later, the cigar factories' workers began to organize into labor unions as a way of fighting to improve their working conditions and pay, which marked the beginning of labor activism in the area. The combination of these movements with the unity of the Cuban population and other immigrant workers helped deepen the community's impact and economic power in Florida. The collective initiative of activism and immigration developed and partially explains the culture of Ybor City to this day.

Both Ybor City and West Tampa were instrumental in Cuba's eventual independence. Inspired by revolutionaries such as Jose Martí, who visited Florida several times, Tampa-area Cubans and their neighbors donated money, equipment, and sometimes their lives to the cause of Cuba Libre. After the Spanish–American War, some Cubans returned to Cuba, but others chose to stay in the U.S. due to the physical and economic devastation caused by conflicts on the island.

== Immigration to the Northeast (1900–1958) ==
Several other small waves of Cuban immigration to the U.S. occurred in the early 20th century (1900–59). Most settled in Florida and the northeast U.S. The majority of the 100,000 Cubans came for economic reasons due to (the Great Depression of 1929, volatile sugar prices, and migrant farm labor contracts). Others included anti-Batista refugees fleeing the military dictatorship, which had pro-U.S. diplomatic ties. During the '20s and '30s, emigration basically comprised workers looking for jobs, mainly in New York and New Jersey. They were classified as labor migrants and workers, much like other immigrants in the area at that time. Thus migrated more than 40,000 in the first decade, encouraged by U.S. immigration facilities at the time and more than 43,000 by the end of the 30s.

Subsequently, the flow of Cubans to the United States fluctuated, due to both the domestic situation in the 40s and 50s in Cuba, and U.S. immigration policies, plus intermittent anti-immigrant sentiment. Cuban migration in those years included persons who could afford to leave the country and live abroad.

The Cuban population officially registered in the United States for 1958 was around 125,000 people, including descendants. Of these, more than 50,000 remained in the United States after the revolution of 1959.

== Cuban exodus to Miami (1953–1959) ==
After the Cuban revolution led by Fidel Castro in 1959, a Cuban exodus began as the new government allied itself with the Soviet Union and began to introduce communism. From 1960 to 1979, tens of thousands of Cubans left Cuba.

Operacion Pedro Pan developed when children arrived in Miami and were met by representatives of Catholic Charities. The children were then sent to live with relatives, foster homes, orphanages, or boarding schools. In order to provide aid to the immigrants, the United States Congress passed the Cuban Adjustment Act in 1966. The Cuban Refugee Program provided more than $730 million of direct financial assistance

Some banks pioneered loans for exiles who did not have collateral or credit but received help in getting a business loan. These loans helped many Cuban Americans to secure funds and start-up their own businesses. With their Cuban-owned businesses and low cost of living, Miami, Florida and Union City, New Jersey (dubbed Havana on the Hudson) were the preferred destinations for many immigrants and soon became the main centers for Cuban American culture. According to author Lisandro Perez, Miami was not particularly attractive to Cubans prior to the 1960s.

It was not until the exodus of the Cuban exiles in 1959 that Miami became a preferred location. Westchester, Florida within Miami-Dade County, was the area most densely populated by Cubans and Cuban Americans in the United States, followed by Hialeah, Florida in second.

Communities like Miami, Tampa, and Union City, which Cuban Americans made their home, experienced a profound cultural impact as a result, as seen in such aspects of their local culture as cuisine, fashion, music, entertainment and cigar-making.

== Cuban exodus after the Revolution ==
The Cuban Revolution caused another vast wave of emigration to the United States. Specifically, the variety in the periods of migration during the first portion of Castro's rule. One aspect to notice when studying Cubans in the U.S. is the heterogeneity of class, race, education, gender, family composition, and values. As a whole, the Cuban community is also very heterogeneous in terms of political position and social class. To be specific, a great portion of Cuban refugees, and at this point, children of refugees, currently reside in Miami because of its closeness in community of other Cuban refugees. There are four political communities that were direct results of the revolution. We can see these political groups having a direct relation to political groups in the U.S. These groups are specifically correlated to the period of revolution that these groups lived in. Those who lived in Cuba in the 1960s faced different challenges than those who lived in Cuba in the 1980s. Each of these groups are part of a spectrum of loyalty to the revolution, and to Castro, than the group who leaves in the 1960s because of how long they stayed in Cuba.

Cuban Exile, also known as Cuban Exodus, was the mass emigration from Cuba after the Cuban revolution in 1959. Cuban Exile came in multiple emigration waves. They can all be correlated to date of departure and social class of immigrants. The two types of immigration patterns are anticipatory and acute. Anticipatory refugees are refugees who left Cuba in anticipation and fear of future political changes. The first wave of immigrants left Cuba, and came to the U.S. in anticipation of economic restrictions, agrarian reform laws, and Cuban nationalism. Acute refugee movements are movements where refugees leave in mass numbers, where the emphasis is on being able to escape, and migrate to anywhere that is safe. The first two phases of immigration were less so pulled to the U.S. by the economic and political freedom, and more so pushed from Cuba by the loss of those aspects of government, in which Cuba lacked.

== Waves of immigration ==
There were five waves of Cuban emigration after the Cuban revolution. Only the first wave of emigration was directly after the revolution. Cubans moved to the United States for many reasons. Cuba is in short proximity to Florida and the United States in general. The other reason that Cubans fled to the United States was because Cuba, as a new government, allied itself with the Soviet Union. At this time, during the Cold War, the United States did everything it could to combat communism. The first wave, also the majority of immigrants were Cuba's elite. These were people who were familiar with the United States' guardianship of Cuba. In the period between January 1959 and October 1962, called historical exile, 248,100 emigrants left Cuba. The main events during this period of emigration were the success of the revolution and the Cuban Missile Crisis. This period of emigration was also called the golden exile because most Cubans who left in this wave were upper and middle class. The second wave of emigration was called the freedom flights, between December 1965 and April 1973, where 260,600 emigrants left Cuba during this period. The main events during this period of emigration was the closing of the port of Camarioca to the end of the airbridge flights.

=== 1980 ===
There was a sizable migration wave of Cubans into Florida in the 1980 Exodo de Mariel Mariel boatlift.

=== Mid-1990s to 2000s ===
In the mid-1990s, after the implementation of the "wet feet, dry feet" policy, immigration patterns changed. Many Cuban immigrants departed from the southern and western coasts and arrived at the Yucatán Peninsula in Mexico while others landed on Isla Mujeres. From there they went to the Texas–Mexico border to request asylum. Many of the Cubans who did not have family in Miami settled in Houston; this has caused Houston's Cuban American community to increase in size. The term "dusty foot" refers to Cubans emigrating to the U.S. through Mexico. In 2005 the Department of Homeland Security had abandoned the approach of detaining every dry foot Cuban who crosses through Texas and began a policy allowing most Cubans to obtain immediate parole.

Jorge Ferragut, a Cuban immigrant who founded Casa Cuba, an agency that assists Cuban immigrants arriving in Texas, said in a 2008 article that many Cuban immigrants of the first decade of the 21st century left due to economic instead of political issues. By October 2008, Mexico and Cuba created an agreement to prevent immigration of Cubans through Mexico.

Puerto Rico also become a destination for Cubans trying to reach the United States. As a U.S. Commonwealth, Puerto Rico was seen as a stepping stone for emigration.

=== Immigration policy ===
Before the 1980s, all refugees from Cuba were welcomed into the United States as political refugees. This changed in the 1990s so that only Cubans who reach U.S. soil were granted refugee status under the "wet foot, dry foot policy". While representing a tightening of U.S. immigration policy, the wet foot, dry foot policy afforded Cubans a privileged position relative to other immigrants to the U.S.

According to a U.S. Census 1970 report, Cuban Americans lived in all 50 states. But as later Census reports demonstrated, most Cuban immigrants settled in south Florida. A new trend in the late 1990s showed that fewer immigrants arrived from Cuba than previously. While U.S. born Cuban Americans moved out of their enclaves, other nationalities settled there.
