= Camp Bulkeley =

Part of Guantanamo Bay Naval Base

Camp Bulkely
- Part of U.S. Naval Station Guantanamo Bay
- Guantanamo Bay Naval Base

Site information
- Owner: US
- Controlled by: US
- Open to the public: No

Site history
- Built: 1943

Camp Bulkeley is an encampment within the United States Naval Station Guantanamo Bay. Camp Bulkeley was constructed between 1943 and 1945. Originally, the camp was constructed to house Marines that were permanently stationed at the United States Naval Station, Guantanamo Bay. Later, the camp was named for Vice Admiral John D. Bulkeley, who was in charge of the base during 1964, when Cuba had accused the United States of stealing water.

The camp has been home to elements of Marine anti-aircraft batteries, Seabees stationed in Guantanamo Bay, and from 1962, the United States Marine Corps took over Camp Bulkeley and used the camp continuously until 1976. In 1976, a permanent Marine Corps contingent was assigned to the base at a different location. The camp was marked for destruction for 1977.

Camp Bulkeley continued to be used after 1977. Various units have occupied the camp. In 1991, the camp was revived and drawn into the national spotlight due to a coup d'etat in Haiti causing a large scale exodus of people. The United States Coast Guard rescued persons in International Waters and brought them to the Naval Station for processing. Rescued persons were held in locations near Camp Bulkeley.

== Former Commands ==
- Seabees
- United States Marine Corps 4th Defense Battalion (1941–42)
- United States Marine Corps 9th Defense Battalion (1942)
- United States Marine Corps 13th Defense Battalion (1942–44)
- United States Marine Corps 2nd Battalion 8th Marine (BLT 2/8) 2nd MarDiv FMF - Ground Defense Force: HQ, Fox, Golf, Hotel Co.’s (1968–73)
- United States Marine Corps Special Mission Force: 2/8, Hotel Co. (1973–75)
- Joint Task Force (JTF) 160
- Joint Task Force (JTF) 170

== Haitian Detainees ==
The camp initially achieved notoriety and received worldwide attention during the early 1990s when a large exodus of people fleeing Haiti due to a military coup d'etat.

Rescued persons attempting to escape the military coup d'etat were intercepted in International Waters by the United States Coast Guard. The Coast Guard would then transfer persons to Guantanamo Bay where HIV-positive refugees and asylum seekers were held during the early 1990s until the legal status of the refugees could be determined. After two years of protest, including a mention by presenters Susan Sarandon and Tim Robbins during the 1993 Academy Awards the camp was declared unconstitutional by United States district court Judge Sterling Johnson Jr. In a negotiated agreement with attorneys for the detainees, that decision was vacated and the camp was closed shortly thereafter.

Following the 30 September 1991 overthrow of democratically elected Haitian President Jean-Bertrand Aristide in a military coup d'etat, a large-scale exodus of Haitian boat people ensued. The United States Coast Guard rescued a total of 41,342 Haitians during 1991 and 1992, more than the number of rescued refugees from the previous 10 years combined.

Just days after the coup d'état, the administration of US President George H. W. Bush ordered the Coast Guard to stop bringing fleeing Haitians to the US, and instead to redirect their boats to the US military base at Guantanamo. There, the United States Immigration and Naturalization Service (INS) ruled that more than half of these refugees were economic migrants, not political refugees, and had them deported back to Haiti. Others were deemed political refugees, but before being allowed entry to the United States, the INS tested them for HIV. Those who tested positive were denied entry under a 1987 law barring emigration of HIV positive individuals into the US. In all, 267 Haitian refugees were held at Guantanamo, making Camp Bulkeley the world's first detention center for people with HIV/AIDS.

The creation of the "Guantanamo HIV Camp," as it was commonly known, infuriated AIDS activists in the United States, who immediately began protesting against it and the Bush administration . During his 1992 presidential campaign, Bill Clinton declared the camp inhumane and illegal, but upon becoming president, his administration took no steps to close the camp.

On 29 January 1993, the detainees - many having spent a year and a half at Camp Bulkeley - went on a hunger strike. Yale Law School students, who had helped file legal challenges to the policy of holding HIV+ refugees at Camp Bulkeley, joined the hunger strike in solidarity. After one week, the Yale students "passed" the hunger strike to students at Harvard, who in turn passed the strike to students at the University of Michigan at Ann Arbor. Hunger strikes, rallies and protests were organized on college campuses around the country, with tens of thousands of students participating. These protests, in conjunction with Susan Sarandon and Tim Robbins using their appearance on the 1993 Academy Awards broadcast to bring attention to the refugees' situation, brought increasing political pressure on the Clinton administration to close the camp.

On 8 June 1993, US district court Judge Sterling Johnson Jr. declared the camps unconstitutional in a scathing judicial opinion. "The Haitians' plight is a tragedy of immense proportion, and their continued detainment is totally unacceptable to this court," he wrote {Haitian Ctrs. Council v. Sale, 823 F. Supp. 1028, 1045 - Note, however, that this decision was vacated by the Supreme Court's subsequent review, at 509 U.S. 155}. The Clinton administration negotiated an agreement where that decision was vacated, and the refugees were allowed to enter the United States. By 18 June, all the refugees had been relocated to New York City or Miami and the camp was closed.

According to a 2003 article in the magazine The Nation, many of the HIV+ refugees held at Camp Bulkeley still have not had their asylum applications processed. Refugees not eventually granted asylum may be forcibly deported to Haiti, over a decade after first arriving at Guantanamo.
