= Archaeological Landscape of the First Coffee Plantations in the South-East of Cuba =

UNESCO heritage site

UNESCO World Heritage Site
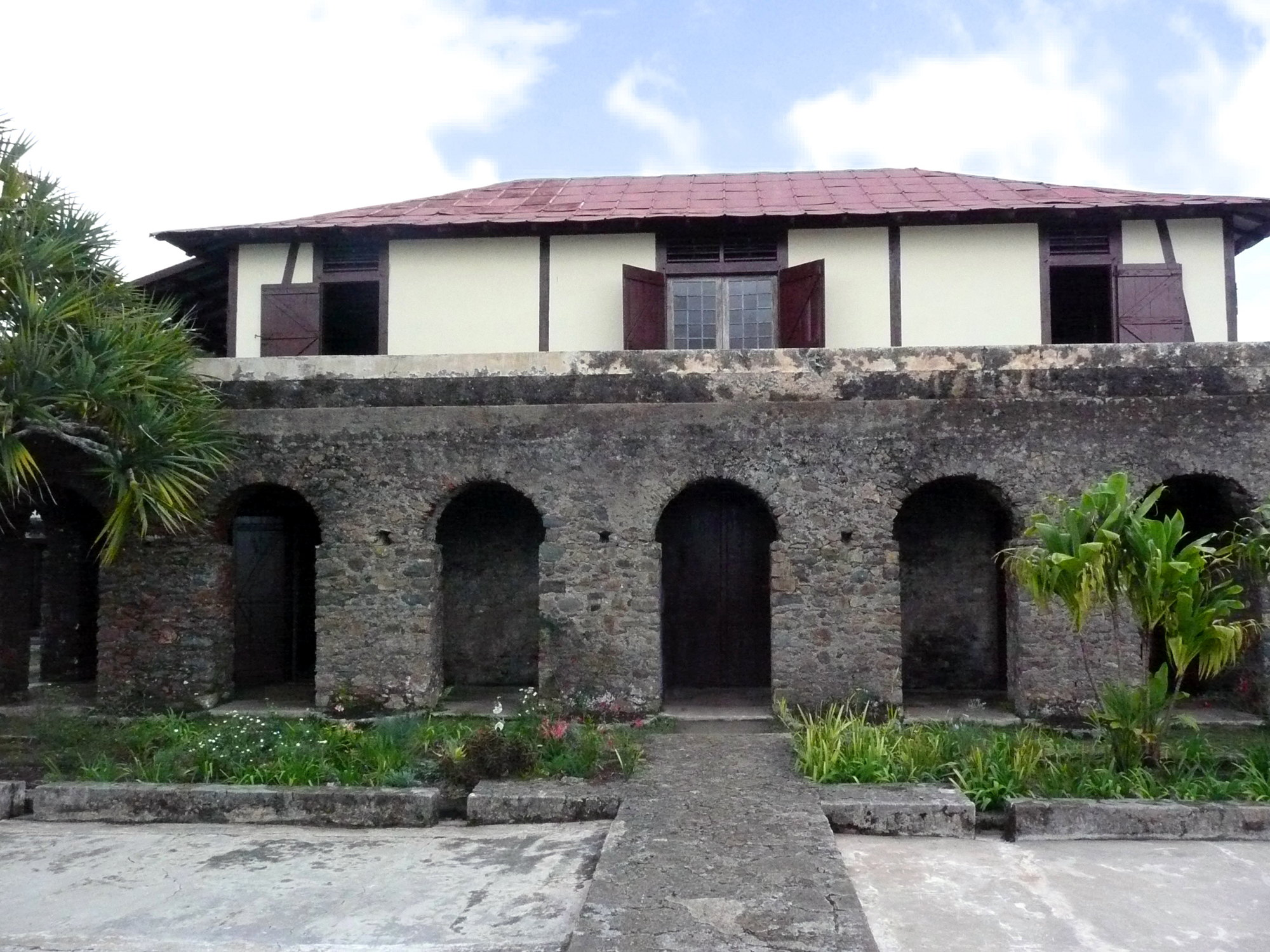
- Cafetal La Isabelica, ancient coffee plantation in foothills of Sierra Maestra, Santiago de Cuba, Cuba

- Location within Cuba
- Location: Santiago de Cuba Province and Guantánamo Province, Cuba
- Criteria: Cultural: (iii), (iv)
- Reference: 1008
- Inscription: 2000 (24th Session)
- Area: 81,475 ha (314.58 sq mi)
- Coordinates: 20°01′48″N 75°23′29″W

The Archaeological Landscape of the First Coffee Plantations in the South-East of Cuba are the remains of several 19th-century coffee plantations located in the foothills of the Sierra Maestra. During the 19th and early 20th centuries, eastern Cuba was primarily involved with coffea cultivation. The remnants of the plantations display the techniques used in the difficult terrain, as well as the economic and social significance of the plantation system in Cuba and the Caribbean.

In 2000, the Archaeological Landscape of the First Coffee Plantations in the South-East of Cuba was added to the UNESCO list of World Heritage Sites.

== Description ==
The World Heritage site includes 171 19th and early 20th-century coffee plantations ('cafetales') across southeast Cuba, grouped into seven distinct locations:

ID	Name	Coordinates
1008–001	La Gran Piedra	20°00′42″N 75°37′51″W
1008–002	El Cobre	20°03′09″N 75°56′36″W
1008–003	Dos Palmas Contramaestre	20°02′59″N 76°05′01″W
1008–004	Yateras	20°21′35″N 74°58′49″W
1008–005	El Salvador	20°17′58″N 75°16′24″W
1008–006	Niceto Pérez	20°08′31″N 75°19′36″W
1008–007	Guantanamo	20°12′43″N 75°12′00″W

The plantations are in different states of preservation, from the Cafetal Isabelica, which is fully restored, so some that are completely ruined. However, they all follow a similar layout. In the center of the plantation is the owner's residence, generally built in the style of Basque architecture, adapted for a tropical climate. Surrounding the owner's house were the slave quarters, made of flimsy wood and roofed with branches and leaves. Each plantation also includes a terraced drying floor ('secadero') for coffee bean preparation and other buildings for milling and roasting.

== History ==
French colonizers established coffee plantations in the 18th century on the island of Hispaniola, but the independence of Haiti in 1804 caused them to flee to Cuba, which was then under Spanish rule. During the 19th century, many coffee plantations were established across the Sierra Maestra, but they were unable to compete with the coffee plantations of Brazil, Colombia, and Costa Rica in the early 20th century, and gradually declined. Today, only a few coffee plantations are still in operation.

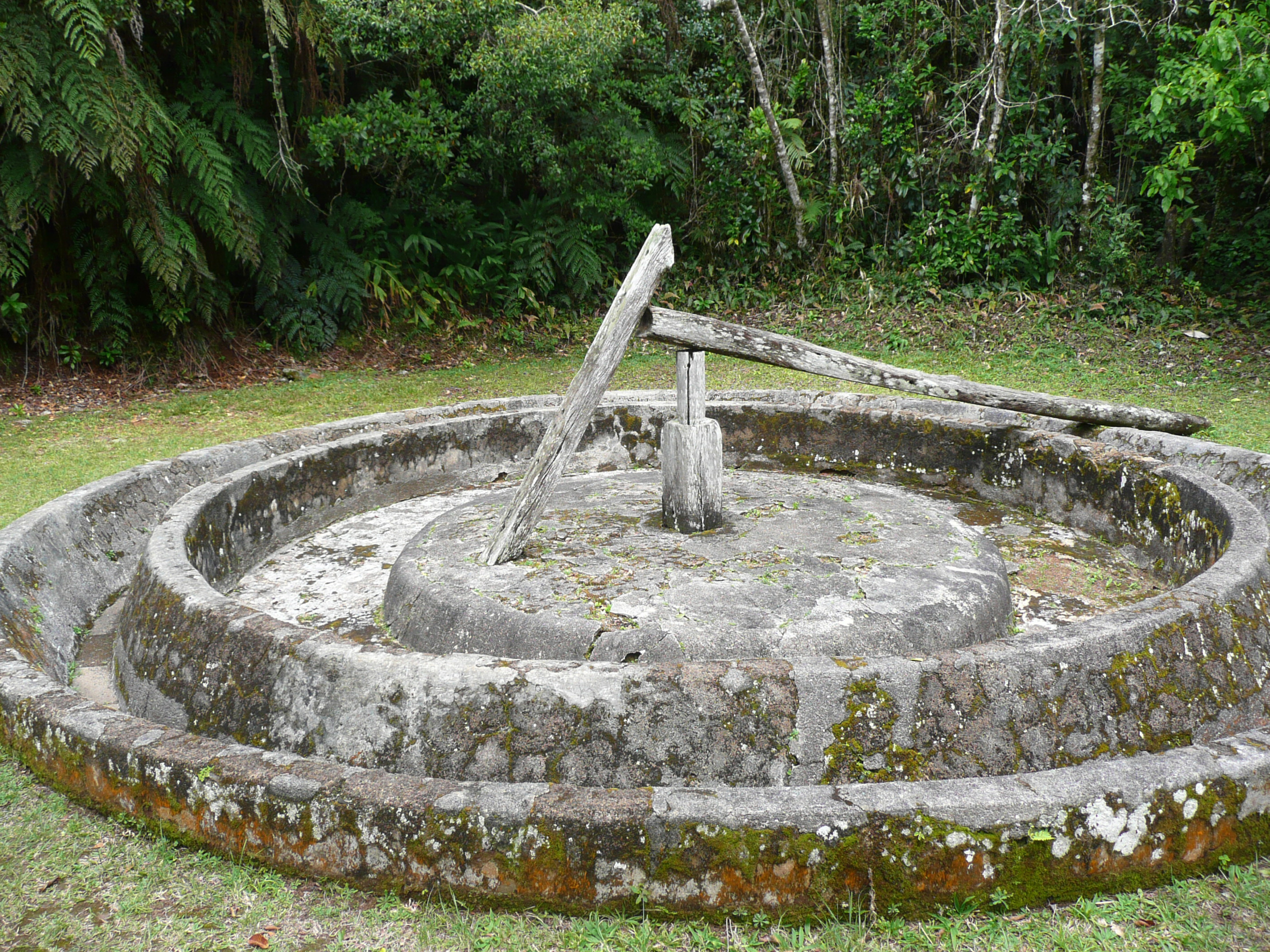
Cafetal Isabelica, Mill to process beans

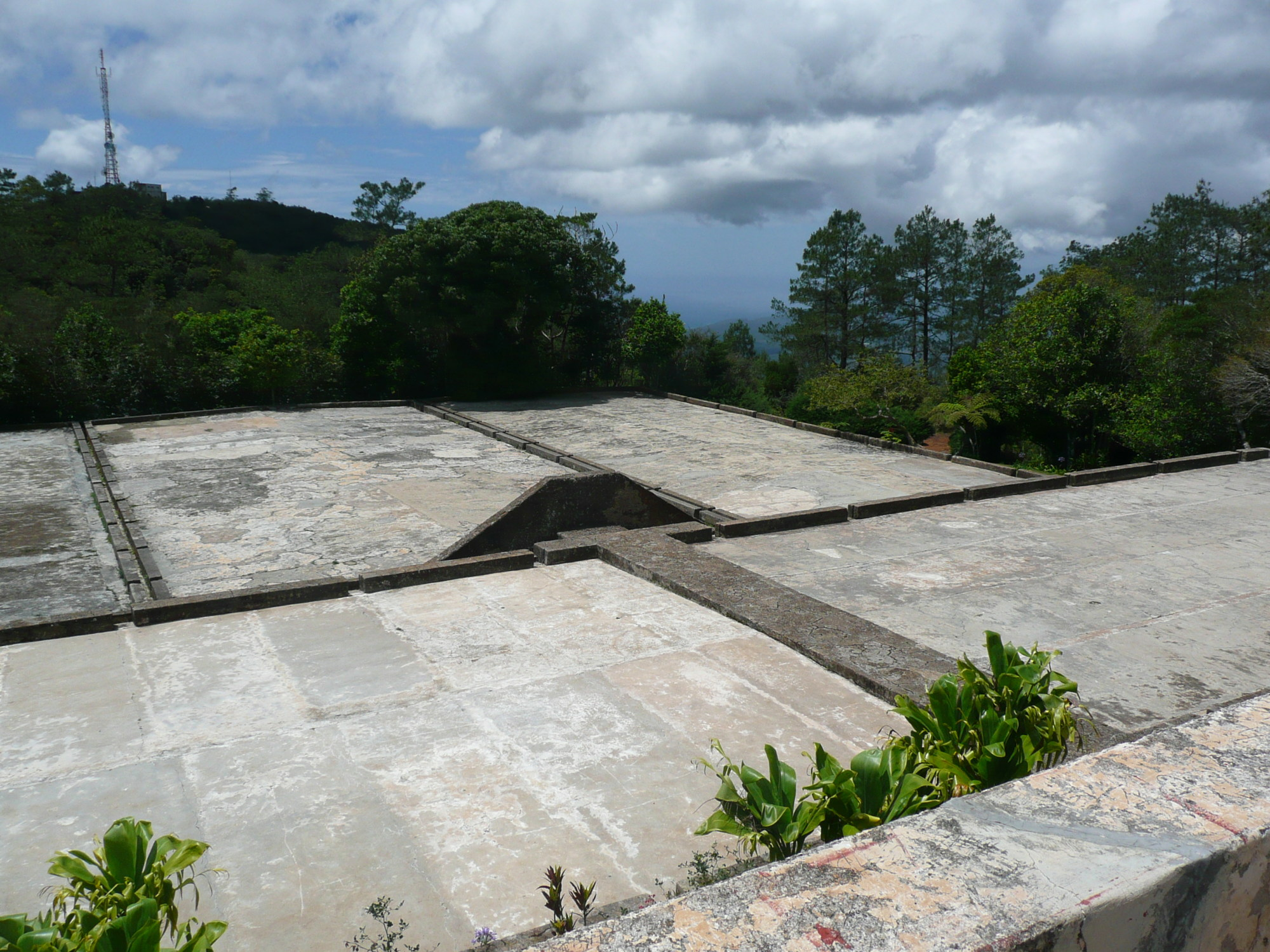
Cafetal Isabelica, Drying place called secadero or tendal

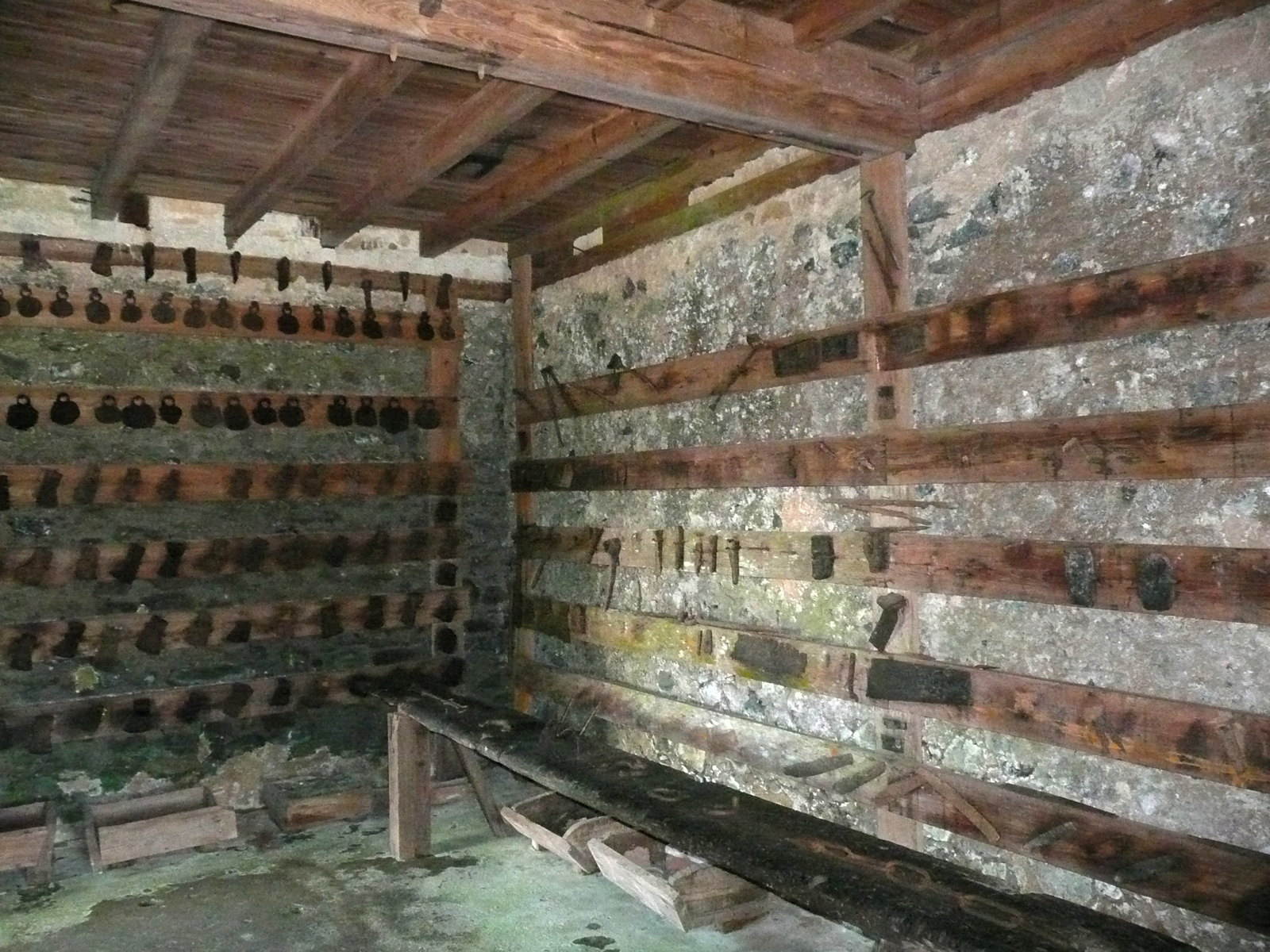
Cafetal Isabelica, Tools and slave chains

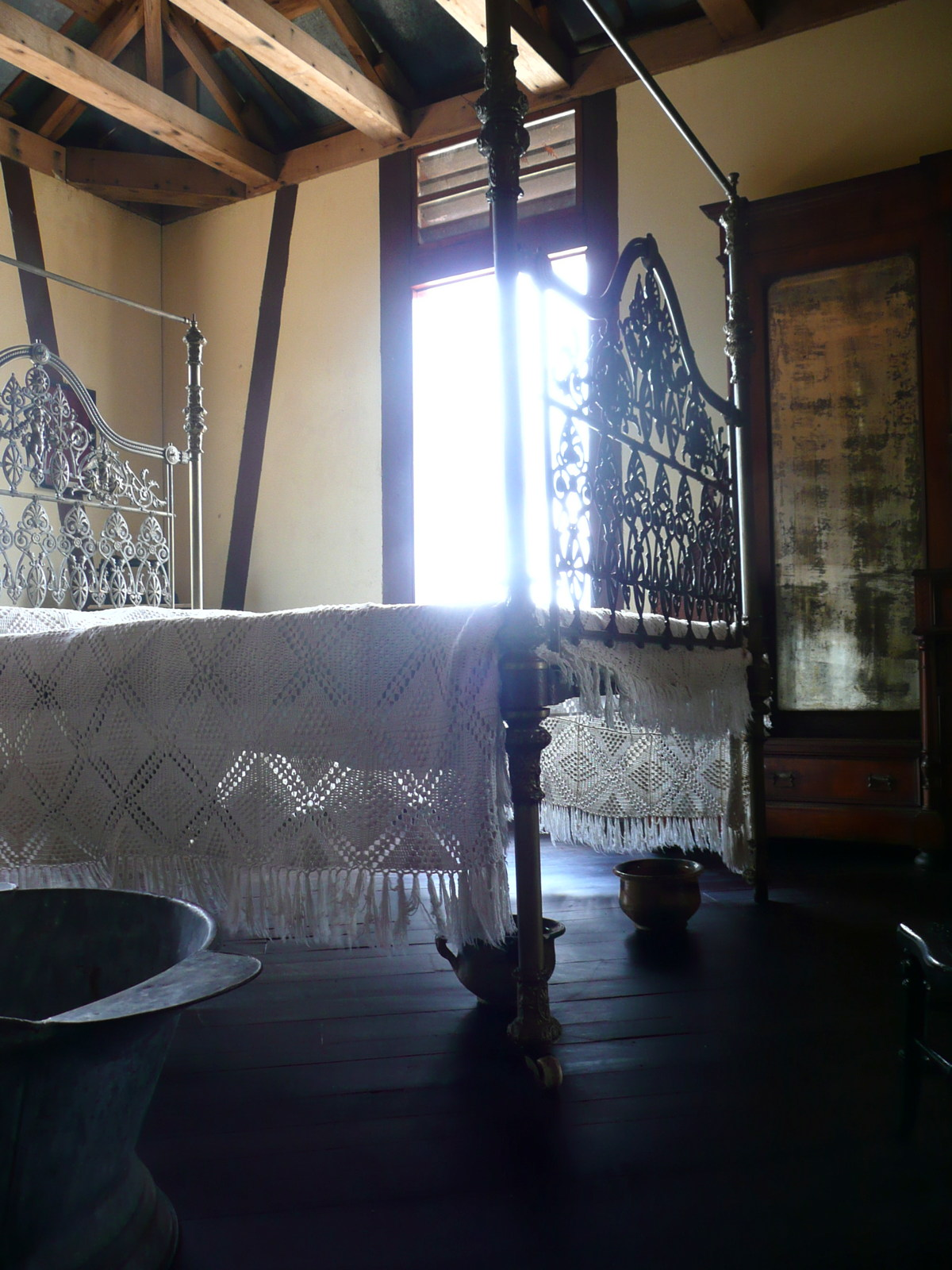
Cafetal Isabelica, Interior of the property

== See also ==
- Coffee production in Cuba
