= Mata Abajo =

- Village
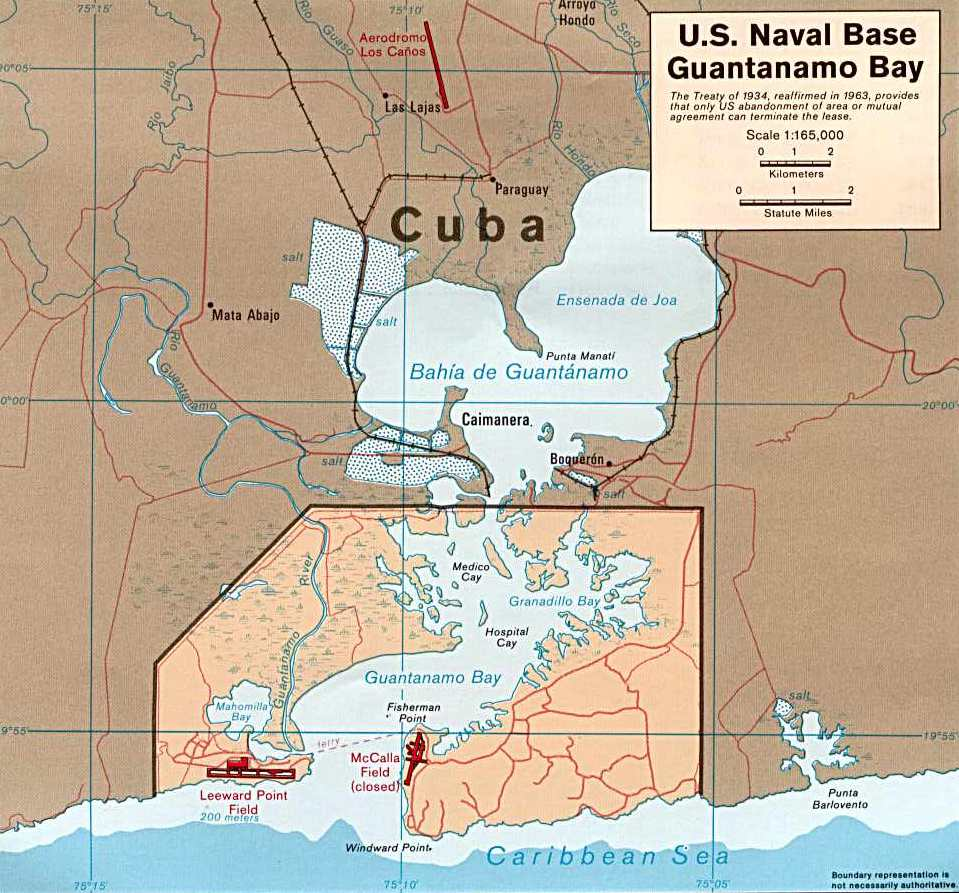
- Map of Guantánamo Bay, showing the location of Mata Abajo

- Location of Mata Abajo in Cuba
- Coordinates: 20°02′00″N 75°13′00″W
- Country: Cuba
- Province: Guantánamo
- Municipality: Caimanera
- Time zone: UTC-5 (EST)
- Area code: +53-21

Mata Abajo is a settlement in Cuba near Guantánamo Bay, located in the municipality of Caimanera, near the borders with Guantánamo. Its name, in Spanish, means "Plant Below".

== See also ==
- Boquerón
- List of cities in Cuba
