= Boquerón, Cuba =

Boquerón Mártiers de la Frontera
- Village
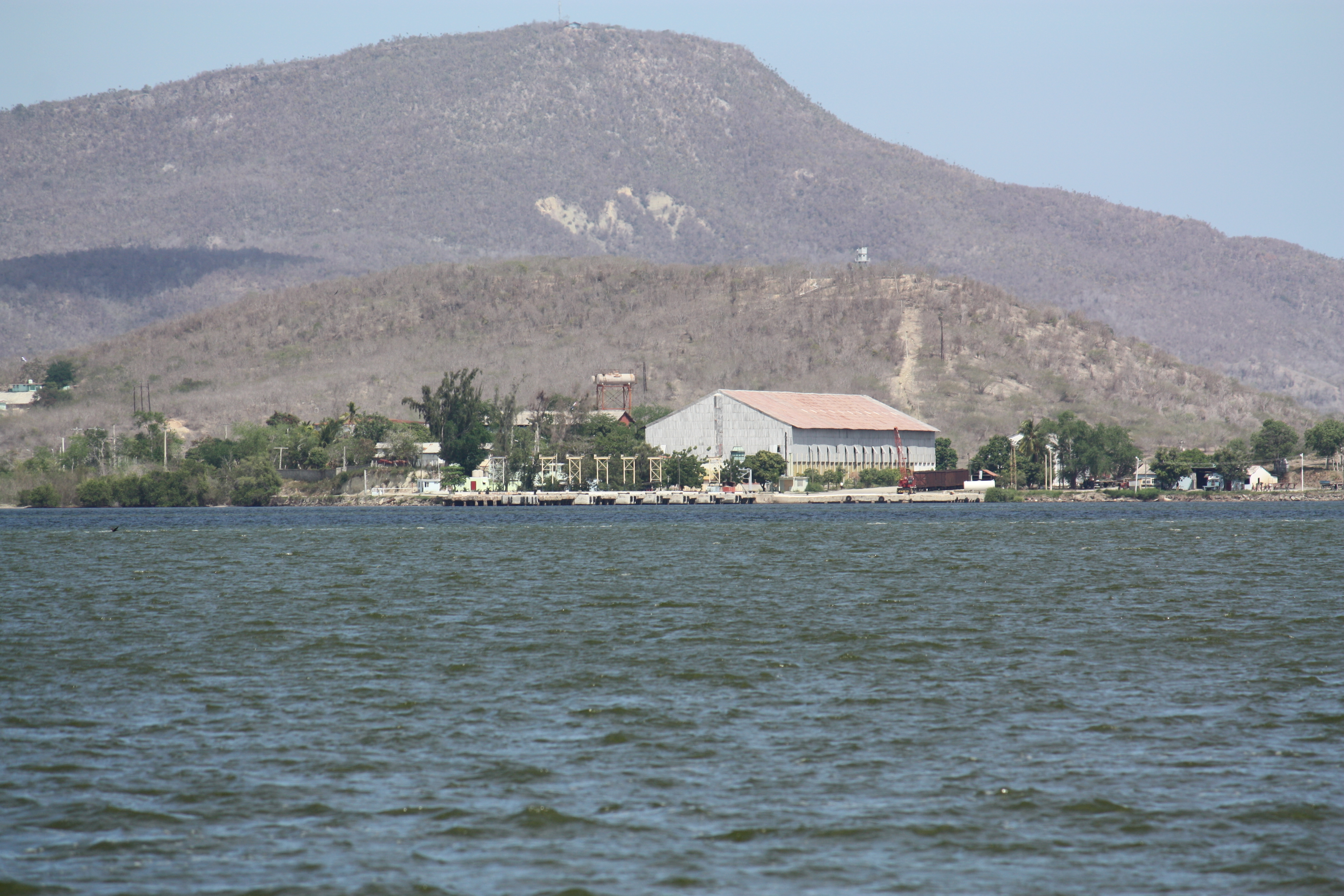
- Boquerón waterfront

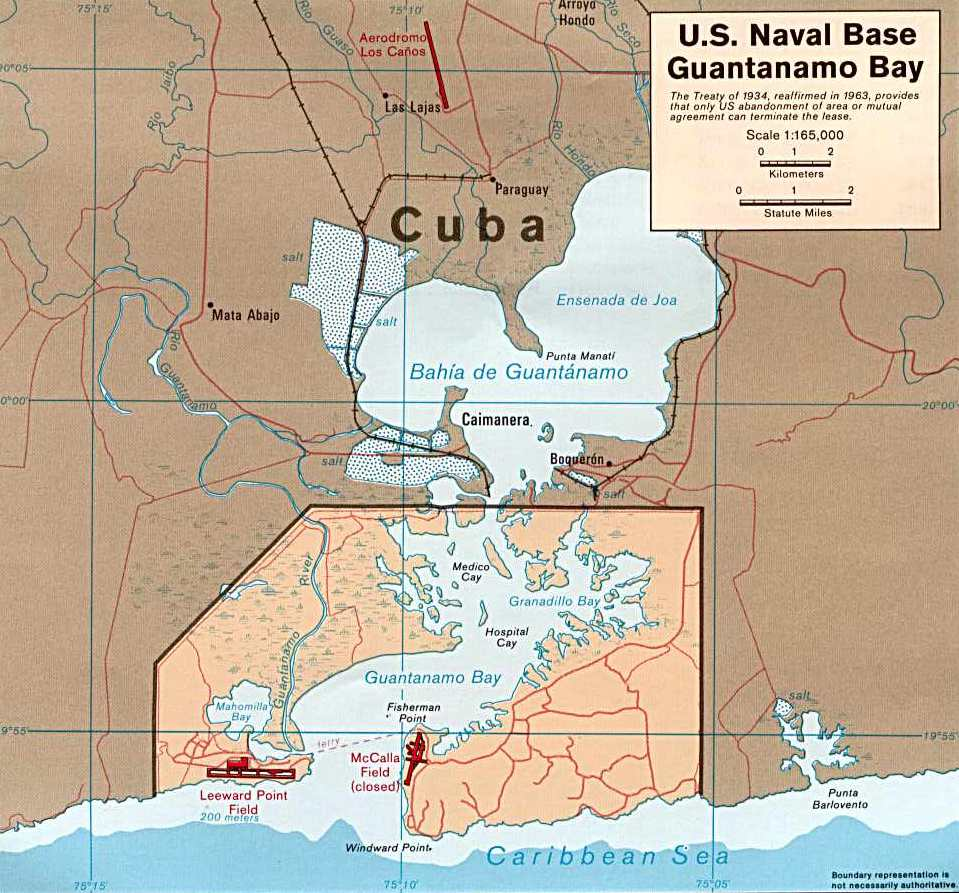
- Map of Guantánamo Bay, showing the location of Boquerón

- Location of Boquerón in Cuba
- Coordinates: 19°58′59.88″N 75°07′00.12″W
- Country: Cuba
- Province: Guantánamo
- Municipality: Caimanera
- Time zone: UTC-5 (EST)
- Area code: +53-21

Boquerón is a Cuban village and consejo popular ("people's council", i.e. hamlet) of the municipality of Caimanera, in the Province of Guantánamo. Located near Guantánamo Bay, it is also known as Mártires de la Frontera, Spanish for "Martyrs of the Border".

== History ==
The village was founded in 1903 and developed urbanistically since the 1970s.

== Geography ==
Boquerón, located in the eastern shore of the bay, is the nearest Cuban settlement to the Guantanamo Bay Naval Base. The North East Gate (19.97382°N 75.08692°W), located 4 km (2 miles) from it, is the only US-Cuban border crossing point. Due to its proximity to the US Base Boquerón is, along with Caimanera, a forbidden town needing a special permission from the government to visit it.

Boquerón lies in front of 3 islets: Cayo Piedra, Cayo Ramón and Cayo Redondo. It is 12 km (7 miles) far from Caimanera and 28 km (18 miles) from Guantánamo.

== Transport ==
The village is the southern terminal of a minor railway line from Guantánamo and counts a little port. It is linked with the Carretera Central highway (11 km; 7 miles far) by a road named "Carretera a Boquerón". Nearest airport, the "Mariana Grajales" of Guantánamo, is located 28 km (18 miles) in the north.

== See also ==
- Mata Abajo
- List of cities in Cuba
