= Paraguay (disambiguation) =

The Republic of Paraguay is a country in South America.

Paraguay may also refer to:

- Paraguay, Cuba
- Paraguay River, a major river in south central South America
