= Boquerón =

Boquerón may refer to:

- Boquerón, Cuba
- Boquerón, Las Piedras, Puerto Rico
- Boquerón, Cabo Rojo, Puerto Rico
- Boquerón Bay, Puerto Rico
- Boquerón, Chiriquí, Panama
- Boquerón Department, Paraguay
- Boquerón (island), an island in the Archipelago of San Bernardo governed by Colombia
- Boquerón River, Honduras
- Playa de Boquerón (Boquerón Beach) the beach adjacent to Boquerón Bay
- El Boquerón (El Salvador), a volcano
- El Boquerón (Honduras), a mountain
- El Boquerón Natural Monument, a national monument on the eponymous Honduran mountain
- Battle of Boquerón (1932) of the Chaco War
- Battle of Boquerón (1866) of the Paraguayan War

== See also ==
- Boquerones, a Spanish dish of marinated anchovies
