= Diamela del Pozo =

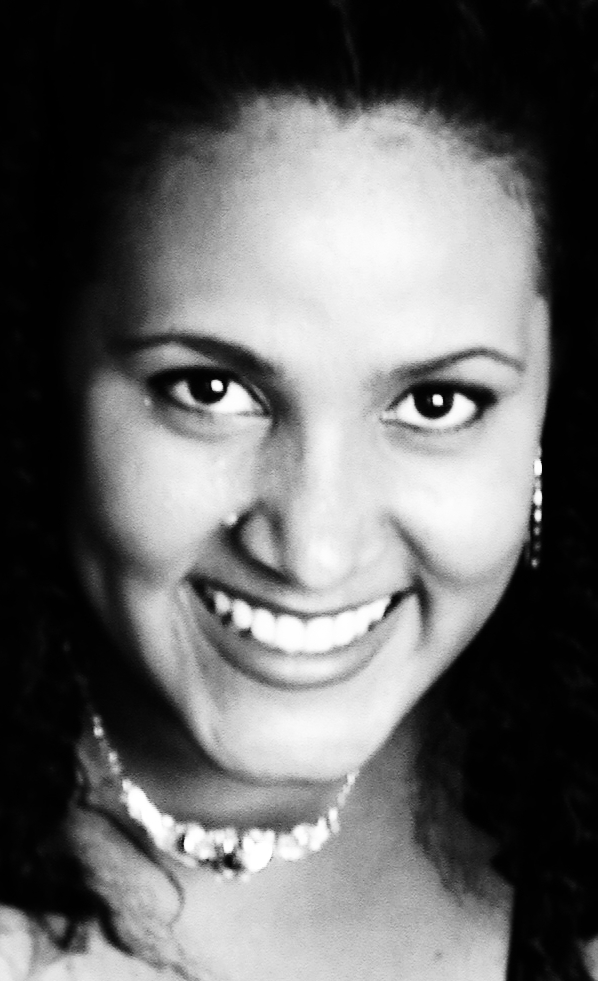

Background information
- Birth name: Diamela del Pozo Pérez
- Born: 2 October 1976 (age 48); Guantánamo, Cuba
- Genres: Cuban music, Afro-Cuban jazz, Latin jazz
- Occupation(s): Mezzo-soprano singer, composer
- Instrument(s): Singing, guitar
- Years active: 1991–present

Diamela del Pozo Pérez (born 2 October 1976), known simply as Diamela, is a Cuban singer living in Spain. She has worked in genres such as rumba, son, bolero, and salsa.

== Biography ==
Diamela del Pozo, the daughter of a humble family, began to show her inclination for singing and music at an early age. In 1991 she debuted in a local orchestra, thus beginning her professional career. From then until she left Cuba in 2004, she joined several of the island's musical groups.

In 1995, she became a member of the newly founded female orchestra Son Damas in Havana, with whom she performed in several European countries, Latin America, the Caribbean, and Japan. She achieved her first recording with the group in 1996, and later in 1999 her second and most recent album after separating from it in the mid-2000s.

In 1998, together with other figures of Cuban music such as Michel Maza, Felix Baloy, Tony Calá, Pedrito Calvo, Tiburón Morales, and Mario "Mayito" Rivera, Diamela recorded a song for the album Sonero Soy, performed in homage to Cuban composer and musician Adalberto Álvarez.

In 1999, she participated in the recording of the album Cuba Humanidad, a tribute by various artists to the late Cuban popular singer Carlos Embale, performing a song by the composer and musician Gonzalo Asencio, accompanied by the folkloric group Los Muñequitos de Matanzas.
