= Iliana Hernández =

Cuban journalist

Iliana Hernández Cardosa (born 1973) is a Cuban activist and journalist. Cardosa has worked as a reporter and correspondent for CiberCuba in Havana. As a result of her work, she has been threatened and arrested several times.

== Biography ==
Cardosa was born in Guantánamo in 1973. In 1996 she migrated to Spain, where she studied dental prosthetics and community management, and played as lead and voice actress in series and movies.

She decided to return to Cuba later. As an activist, Cardosa is a founding member of the Somos+ movement and participated in 2013 and 2016 in the Estado de Sats project along with José Daniel Ferrer, leader of the UNPACU, who was deported to Santiago from Cuba. In Cuba she directed and produced Lente Cubano, an audiovisual program that covered Cuban reality through culture, citizen complaints, the promotion of private businesses and the inclusion of both prominent and less known artists in the island; the program was launched in Miami in September 2016. Upon her return to the island she was warned about its content at the airport, especially with the "Citizen complaints" section. The audiovisual, which circulated on the internet through El Paquete (The Package), led her to gain the attention of the Cuban state security. In February 2017, Hernández was arrested in Old Havana and stripped of her personal belongings.

In May 2019, she was violently detained along with other activists during the march organized by the Cuban LGBTI + community. In January 2020, state security agents and the National Revolutionary Police (PNR) raided her house looking for red paint, that would link her with the Clandestinos opposition movement, whose actions they intended to eliminate, (pouring paint at images, murals and busts of Fidel Castro).

To boycott her activity, the Cuban government accused her of receiving stolen goods in January 2020 and had some personal items confiscated, which according to the regime did not have the documentation that proved her ownership. In February 2020, the activist received a death threat while she was making one of her usual Facebook broadcasts from Havana, when a user told her that one day she was going to "wake up with a mouth full of ants." In June, Hernández denounced that her internet had been cut hours before the protest called by independent organizations to demand justice as a result of the killing of a young man in Guanabacoa at the hands of a policeman. She was eventually detained to prevent her from attending said protest.

== Personal life ==
Cardosa currently lives in Cojímar, municipality of Havana.
