= Caimanera =

- Municipality
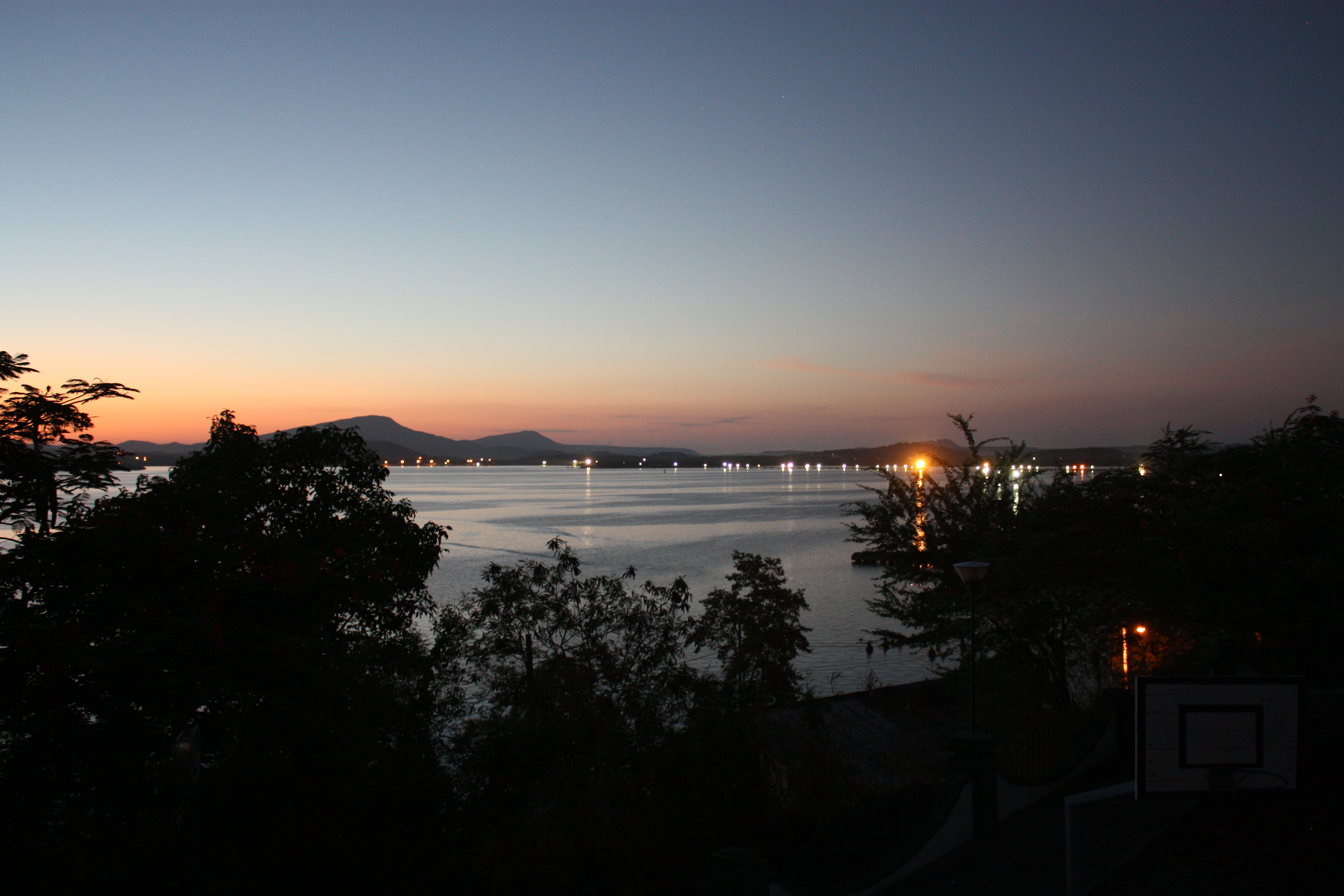
- Guantánamo Bay at Caimanera

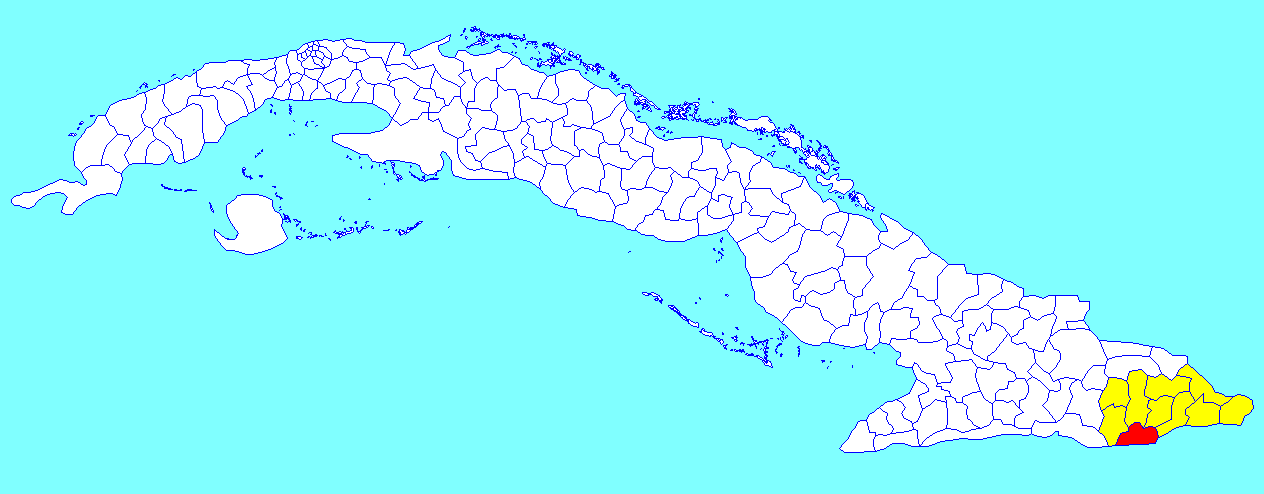
- Caimanera municipality (red) within Guantánamo Province (yellow) and Cuba
- Coordinates: 19°59′41″N 75°09′36″W
- Country: Cuba
- Province: Guantánamo

Area
  - Total: 366 km^{2} (141 sq mi)
- Elevation: 5 m (16 ft)

Population (2022)
  - Total: 11,273
  - Density: 30.8/km^{2} (79.8/sq mi)
- Time zone: UTC-5 (EST)
- Area code: +53-21
- Website: www.caimanera.gob.cu/es/

Caimanera is a municipality and town in Guantánamo Province on the south eastern coast of Cuba. It is a fishing village and port built on the west shore of the sheltered Guantánamo Bay, just north of the US naval base and 34 kilometres (21 mi) south of the provincial capital, Guantánamo.

== History ==
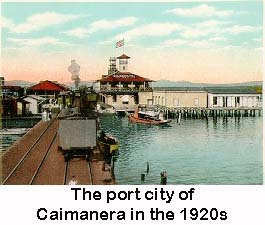
The port city of Caimanera in the 1920s

The town was named for the caiman alligators which were once common in the river and in the mangrove labyrinths of the upper Bay, but which have since declined in numbers.

The community of fishermen and salt mine workers flourished at the beginning of the 20th century precisely because of the base's construction. It was a magnet for Cuban workers and a popular spot for visitors, including Cubans from across the island and people from nearby countries such as Jamaica.

Caimanera was liberated on December 19, 1958. On this anniversary the town usually has a parade and a political action.

The Havana Times reports that in 1959, not long after the Cuban Revolution drove out the pro-American Batista administration, two US Navy tugboats came to Caimanera to apply their powerful water-cannons to put out a raging fire that destroyed three city blocks.

The Cuban Revolution of 1959 marked strained relations between Cuba and America, in general, and specifically between the inhabitants of Caimanera and the nearby Guantanamo Bay Naval Base. Prior to the revolution, off-duty US personnel from the base were free to visit Caimanera, and the town was home to many bars and bordellos that catered to them. The base employed over three thousand Cuban workers. Cuban contractors, who employed the workers, whisked them to their jobs on the base in speed-boats.

After the revolution, both sides made policy changes. Cuba allowed workers to continue to work on the base, but they had to walk to the remote North-East Gate. The USA would continue to employ those Cubans who already had jobs, but would not hire any new Cuban workers. The number of Cuban workers dwindled, with the last two retiring in 2012.

On May 7, 2023, residents of Caimanera protested a lack of food. With train service to Guantanamo shut down for lack of fuel, and no fuel for trucks to deliver food, local stores were empty. Many residents lacked transportation to travel the 34 km to Guantanamo to buy food. Videos posted on social media showed hundreds of residents protesting in the streets, and then police and soldiers beating the protestors, including women and children. The Cuban government shut down the Internet nationwide for 24 hours and used a radio jammer to stop residents of Caimanera from using T-Mobile wireless Internet service.

== Geography ==
Caimanera borders with the municipalities of Niceto Pérez, Guantánamo, Manuel Tames and San Antonio del Sur. Its territory includes the villages of Boquerón (also known as "Mártires de la Frontera"), Cayamo and Mata Abajo.

Residents of this town are the closest Cuban neighbours to the US naval base. The North East Gate, located near Boquerón, is the only US-Cuban border crossing point. Due to its proximity to the US Base, Caimanera is a forbidden town (zona militar), needing a special permission from the government to visit it.

Upper Guantanamo Bay is one of Cuba's bahias bolsas or pocket bays, with a narrow neck between the bay and the sea. Caimanera is located on the narrow neck between the upper and lower bays.

Caimanera is within range of the T-Mobile towers at the naval base and so is the only town in Cuba with American cellphone and Internet service. Residents can get 4G service.

== Demographics ==
In 2022, the municipality of Caimanera had a population of 11,273. With a total area of 366 km^{2} (141 sq mi), it has a population density of 28.9/km^{2} (75/sq mi).

== Economy ==
Ships chiefly export sugarcane and coffee. Fishing is no longer part of the economy because the fish are in the lower part of the bay, in the territory of the naval base.

== Transport ==
Linked to Guantánamo by the "Carretera a Caimanera" road, the municipal territory of Caimanera is located close to the "Carretera Central". The town counts also a terminal station on a minor railway line to Guantánamo. The train stopped running during the COVID pandemic due to a lack of fuel. Service has since resumed.

== Gallery ==
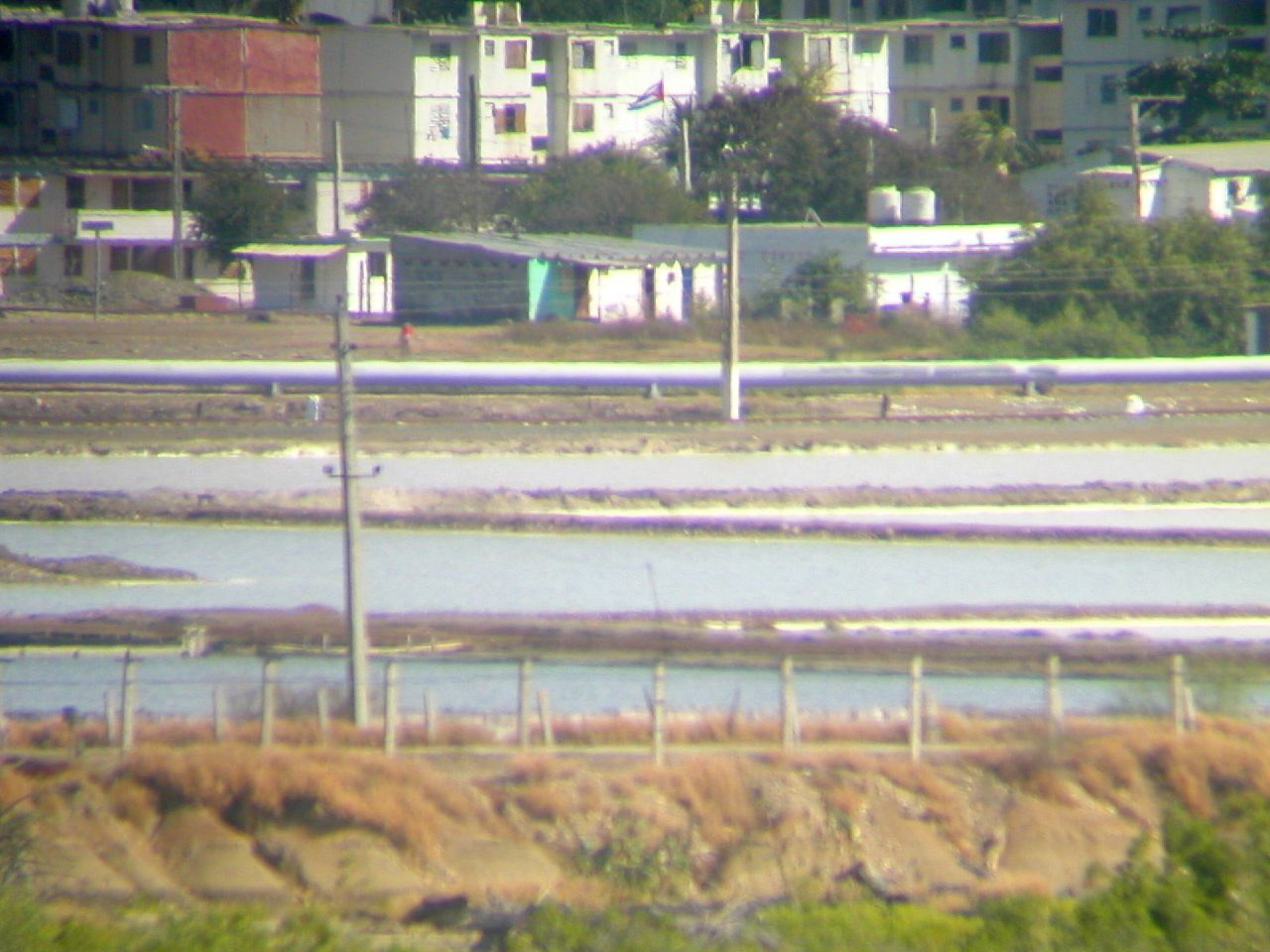
View of the town (1)

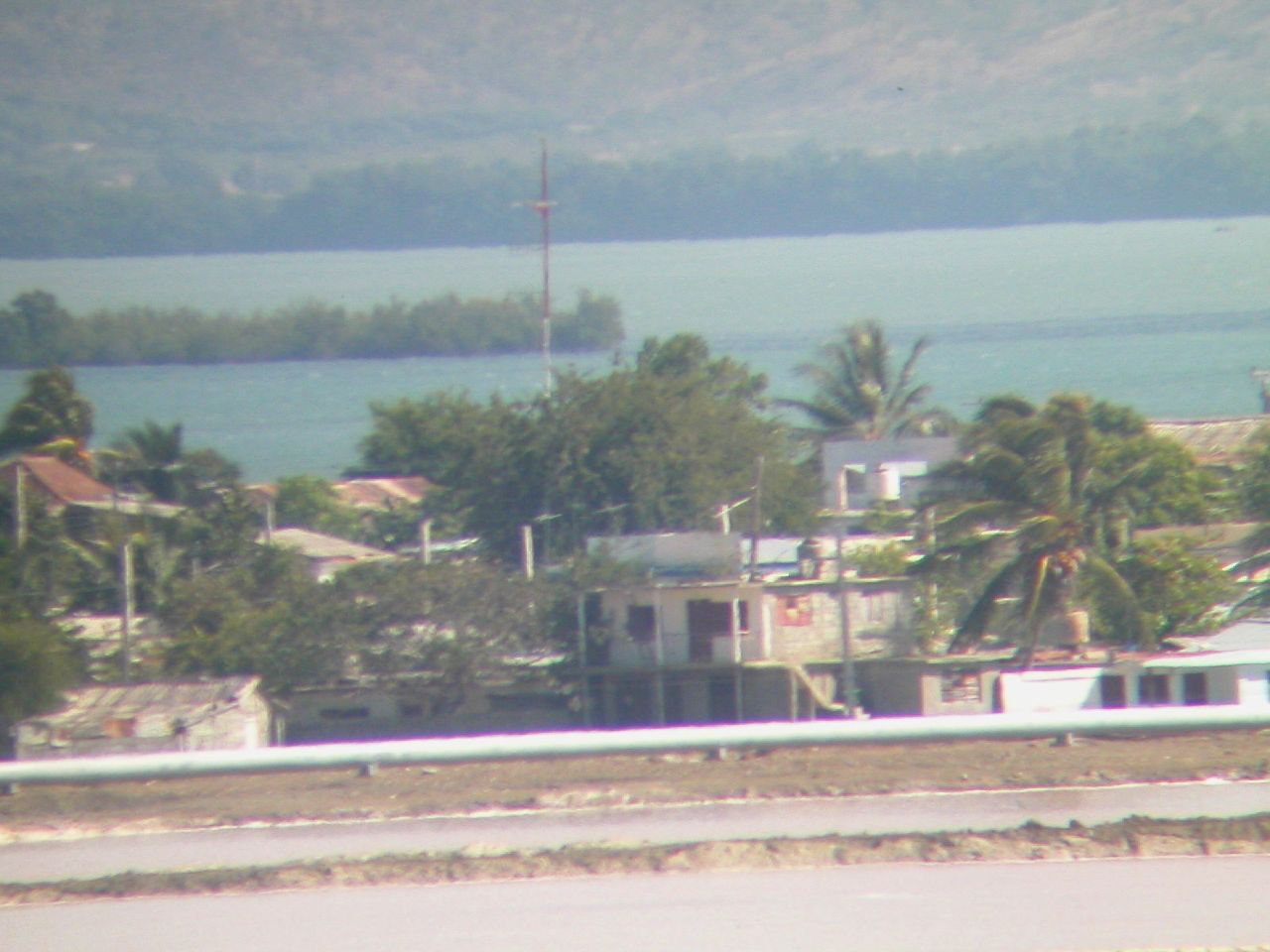
View of the town (2)

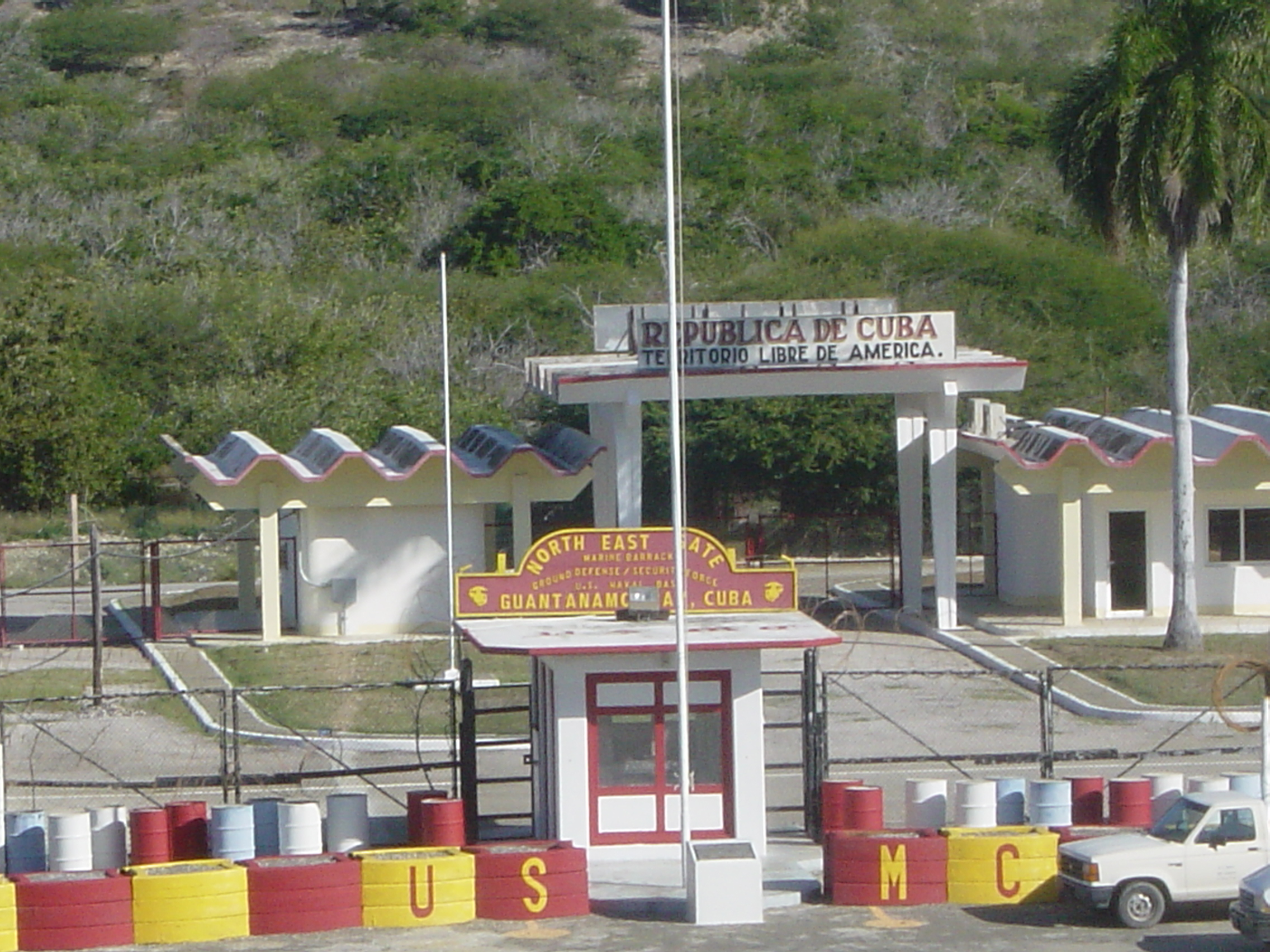
The "North East Gate" border crossing near Boquerón

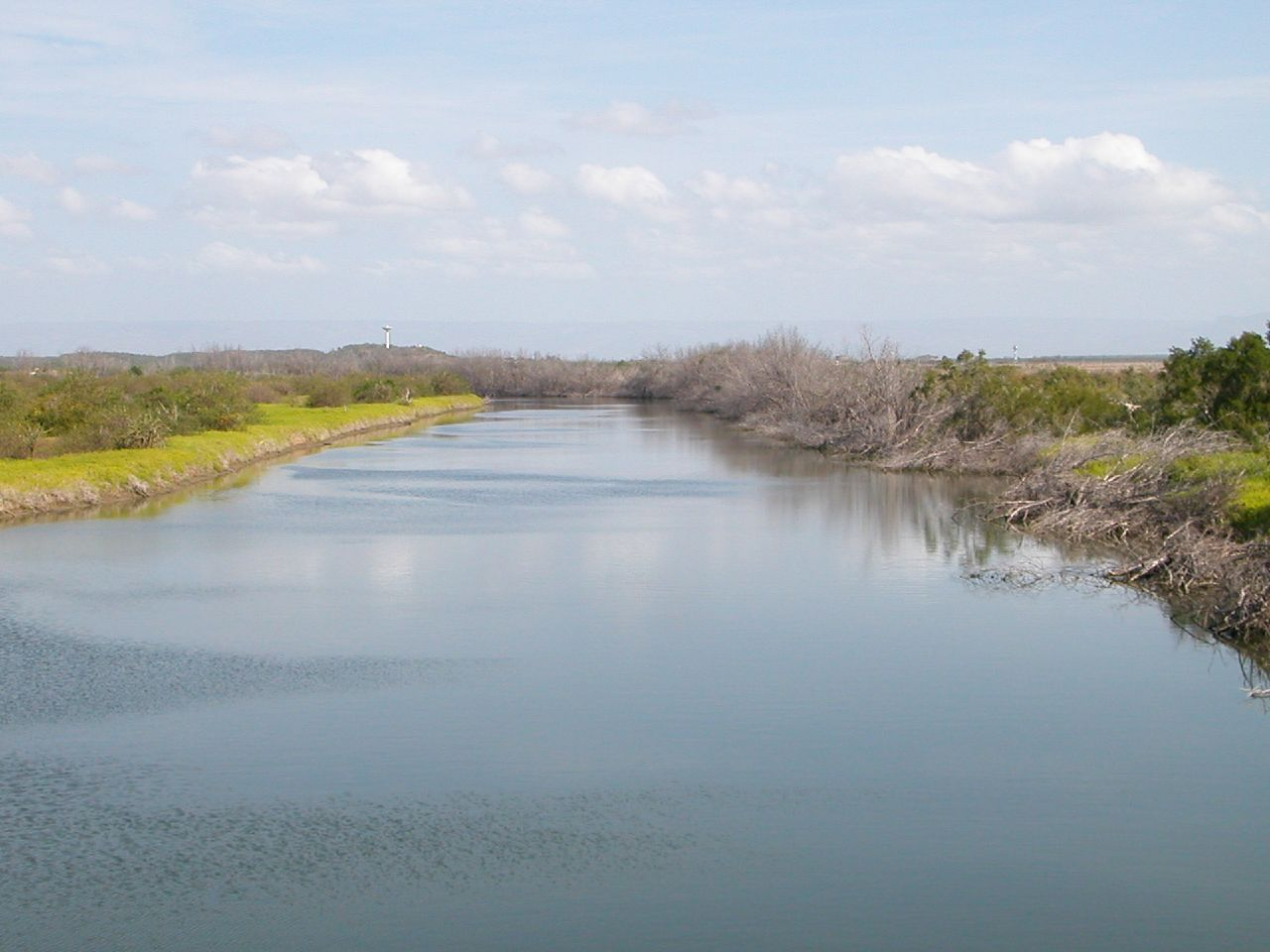
Guantánamo River near Caimanera

== See also ==
- Guantánamo Bay
- List of cities in Cuba
- Municipalities of Cuba
