= Coffee production in Cuba =

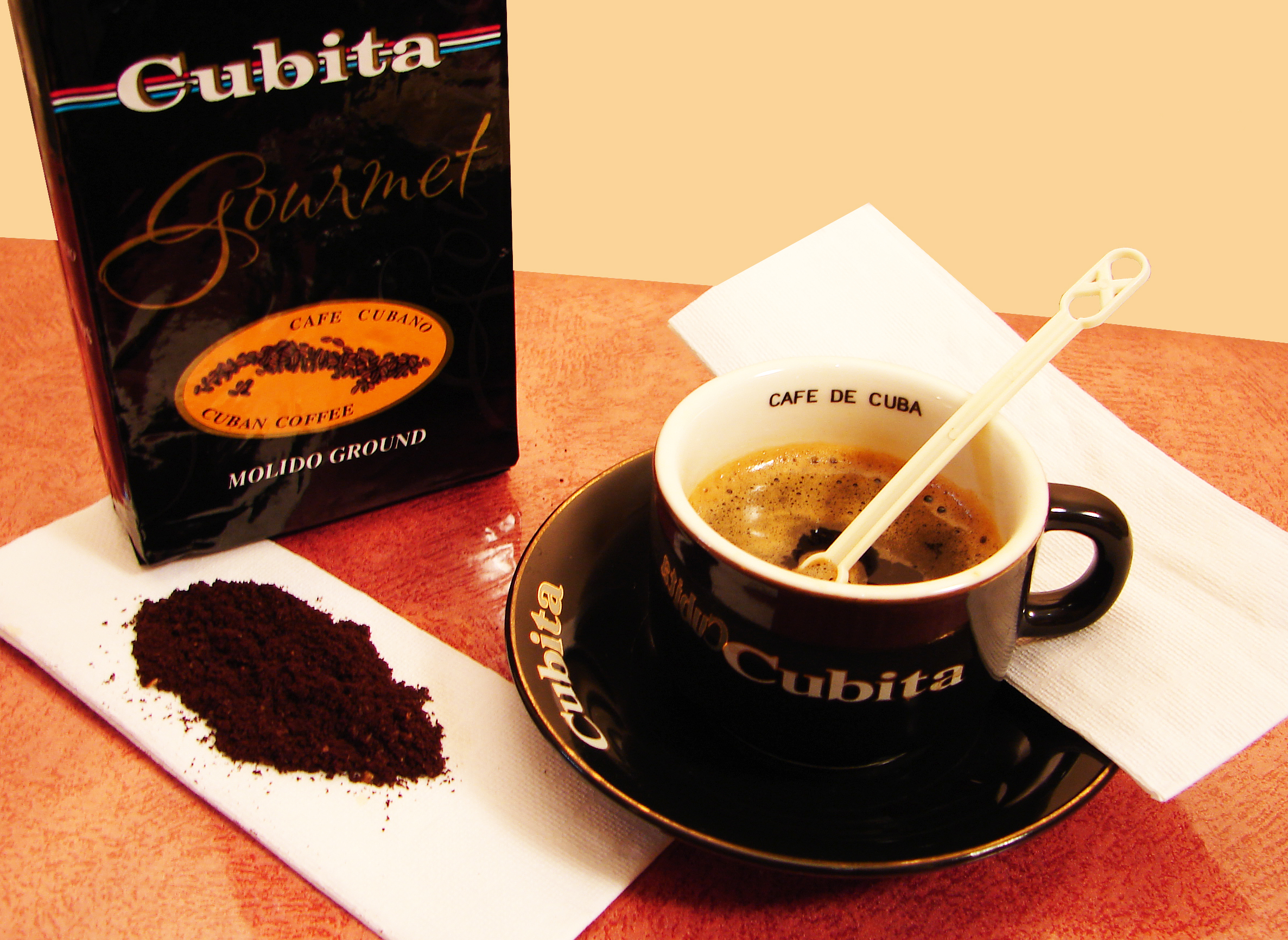
Cuban coffee

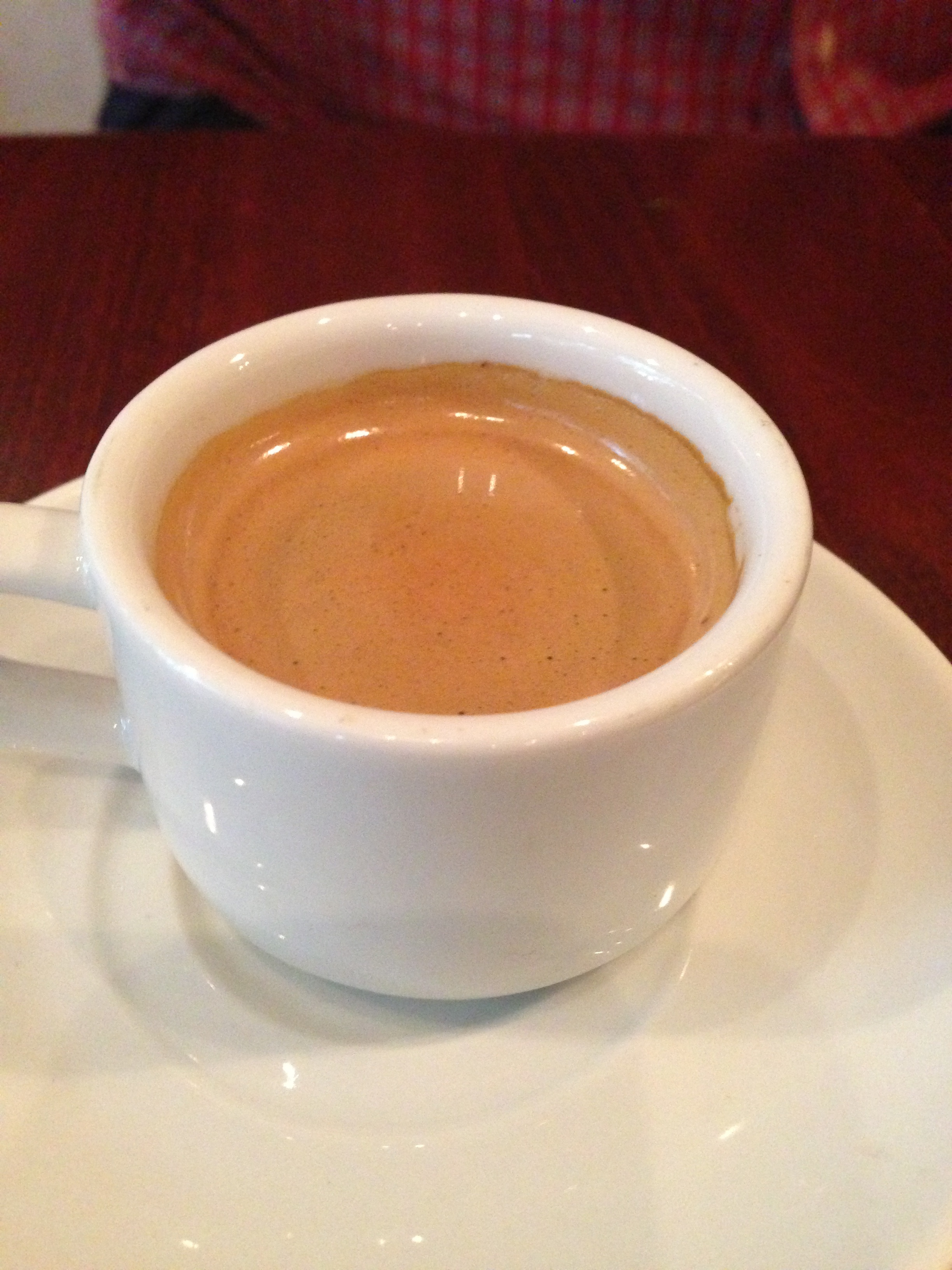
A cup of espresso prepared with Cuban coffee

Coffee has been grown in Cuba since the mid-18th century. Boosted by French farmers fleeing the revolution in Haiti, coffee farms expanded from the western plains to the nearby mountain ranges. Coffee production in eastern Cuba significantly increased during the 19th and early 20th centuries. At its peak production, Cuba exported more than 20,000 metric tons (22,046 short tons) of coffee beans per year in the mid-1950s. After the Cuban Revolution and the nationalization of the coffee industry, coffee production slowly began to decline until it reached all time lows during the Great Recession. Once a major Cuban export, it now makes up an insignificant portion of Cuban trade. By the 21st century, 92 percent of the country's coffee was grown in area of the Sierra Maestra mountains. All Cuban coffee is exported by Cubaexport, which pays regulated prices to coffee growers and processors.

== History ==
José Antonio Gelabert introduced the first coffee plant to Cuba in 1748. By 1791, French colonists, fleeing the abolition of slavery during the Haitian Revolution, introduced better coffee production methods to Cuba. Coffee production in eastern Cuba during the 19th and early 20th centuries "resulted in the creation of a unique cultural landscape, illustrating a significant stage in the development of this form of agriculture." As such, UNESCO has listed the Archaeological Landscape of the First Coffee Plantations in the South-East of Cuba as a World Heritage Site since 2000.

After the outbreak of the World War I in 1914, the export of Cuban goods (including coffee) to Europe proved difficult.

Prior to the Castro era, Cuba's coffee industry prospered. In the mid-1950s, Cuba was exporting more than 20,000 metric tons (22,046 short tons) of coffee beans per year. Cuban coffee was sold at premium prices on world markets. Much of that coffee was exported to Europe, particularly the Netherlands and Germany.

Following Cuban Revolution in 1959, coffee production in Cuba declined largely because of the dissolution of large farms and a disincentive for small farm production. As a result, Cuban coffee producers began mixing coffee beans with roasted peas. Mixing coffee beans with peas remained a staple in Cuba until pure coffee returned to the Cuban ration books in 2005. Rising Robusta prices led to the return of roasted peas to Cuban coffee in 2011.

In 1962 the United States imposed an embargo on all goods imported from Cuba, further damaging the Cuban coffee industry. During the embargo, Cuban coffee was not prevalent in the US market.

Dissolution of the Soviet Union caused a major decline in Cuban coffee production, going from 440,000 60-kg bags of coffee in the 1989–1990 production cycle to eventually reaching an all-time low of 7,000 bags during the 2007–2008 cycle. The production of Cuban coffee has since rebounded to between 100,000 and 130,000 bags per year due to government investment in increased coffee production including raising coffee prices and providing better equipment.

== Production ==
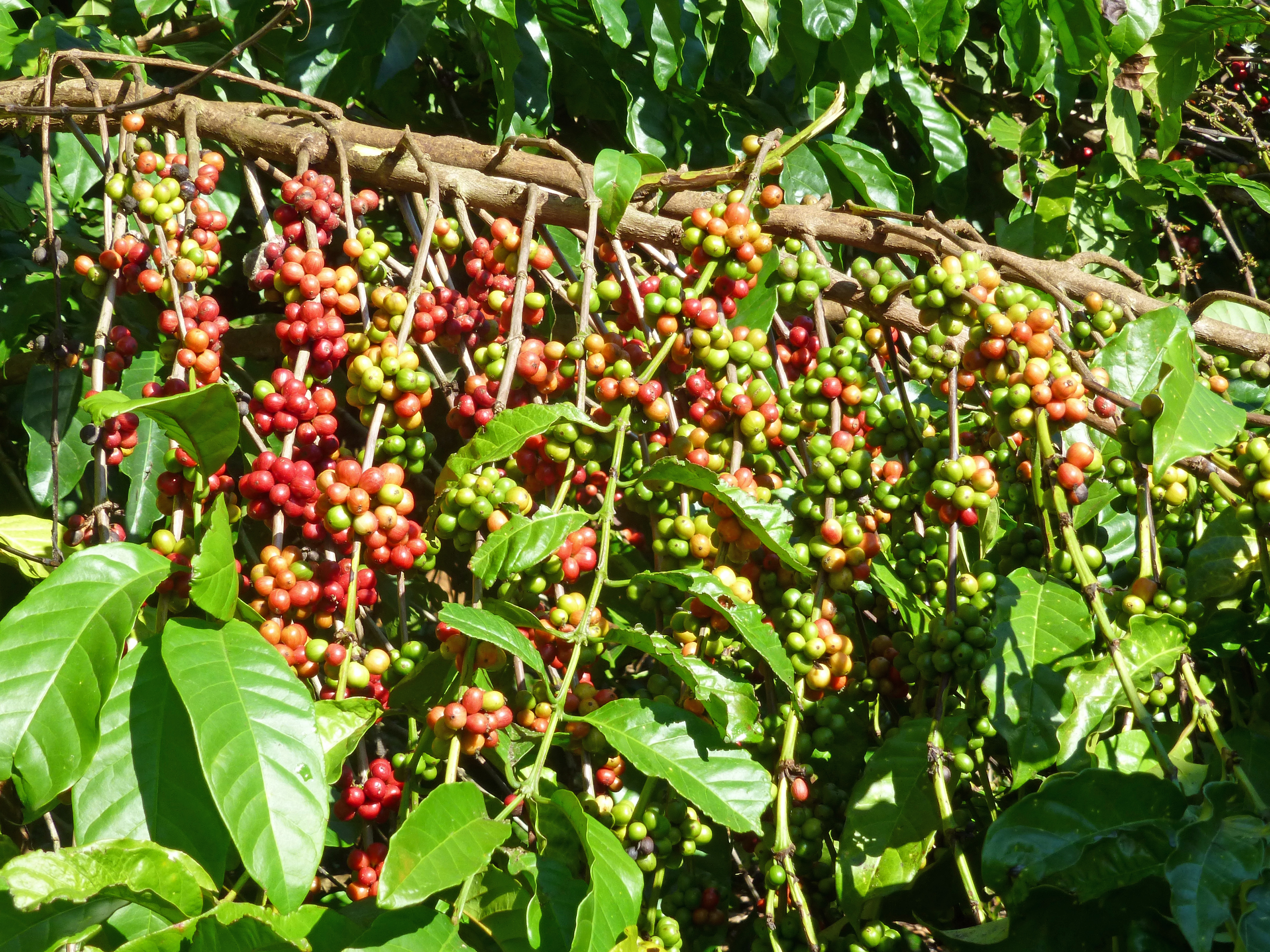
Both robusta (pictured) and arabica are produced in Cuba

By the 21st century, 92 percent of the country's coffee was grown in areas of the Sierra Maestra mountains, especially under forest canopies. The coffee harvest runs September through January, peaking in October and November.

The island produces both arabica and robusta beans, with most production coming from small family farms. In 2003, Cuba began exporting organic coffee to Europe and Japan, with more than 4,000 hectares (9,900 acres) certified as organic. Centered in the eastern portion of the island, the area produced 93 metric tons (103 short tons) of organic coffee that was selling at prices 40% higher than the standard Cuban coffee.

According to the FAO, the total number of hectares where coffee is harvested in Cuba has fallen from 170,000 hectares (420,000 acres) in 1961 to 28,000 hectares (69,000 acres) in 2013.

== Distribution ==
All coffee from Cuba is exported by Cubaexport, which pays a government-regulated, fixed price to coffee growers and processors for their coffee. Currently, Japan and France are Cuba's major coffee export markets, with smaller amounts going to Germany, the United Kingdom, Canada, and New Zealand.

Domestic distribution is currently limited to two ounces of coffee rations every 15 days for Cuban citizens.

== See also ==
- Agriculture in Cuba
- Cuban espresso
- List of countries by coffee production
