= La Yaya Dam =

Dam in Cuba

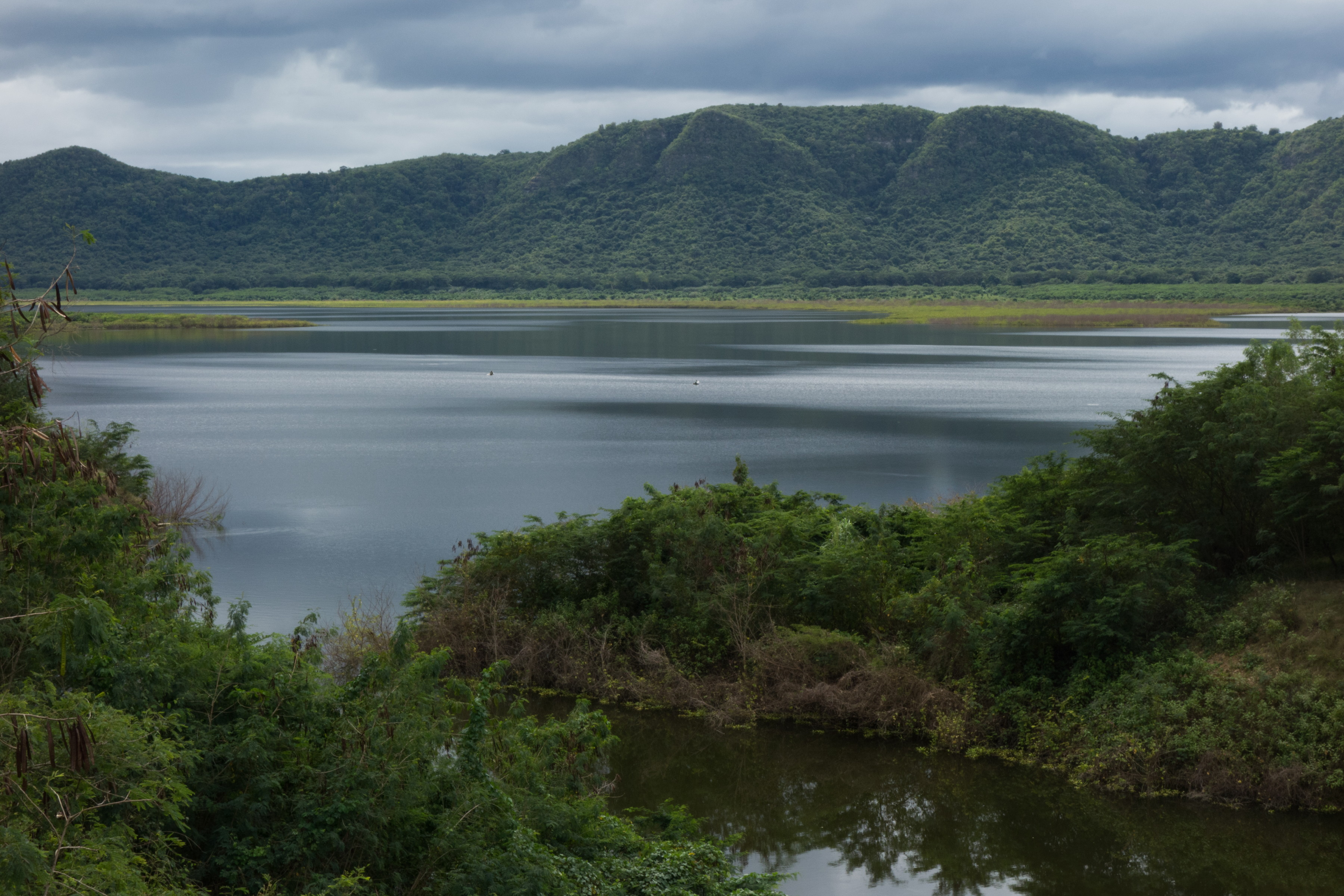
- La Yaya Reservoir

- Location within Cuba
- Country: Cuba
- Location: Niceto Pérez, Guantánamo Province
- Coordinates: 20°7′36.94″N 75°21′33.45″W
- Purpose: Flood control, water supply
- Status: Operational
- Opening date: 1973; 53 years ago

Dam and spillways
- Type of dam: Embankment
- Impounds: Guantánamo River
- Elevation at crest: 85.7 m (281 ft)
- Spillway type: Chute, free overflow
- Spillway capacity: 3,900 m^{3}/s (140,000 cu ft/s)

Reservoir
- Creates: La Yaya Reservoir
- Total capacity: 160,000,000 m^{3} (130,000 acre⋅ft)
- Active capacity: 146,000,000 m^{3} (118,000 acre⋅ft)
- Catchment area: 555 km^{2} (214 mi^{2})
- Surface area: 13.3 km^{2} (5.1 mi^{2})
- Maximum length: 7.6 km (4.7 mi)
- Normal elevation: 79.1 m (260 ft)

La Yaya Dam is an embankment dam on the Guantánamo River near the town of La Yaya in the municipality of Niceto Pérez in Guantánamo Province, Cuba. The dam was completed in 1973 for flood control, irrigation of up to 8,000 ha (20,000 acres), and water supply for municipal and industrial uses. The reservoir has a storage capacity of 160,000,000 m^{3} (130,000 acre⋅ft), the second largest in the eastern part of the country after Melones Dam.
