= Las Lajas, Cuba =

Las Lajas
- Village
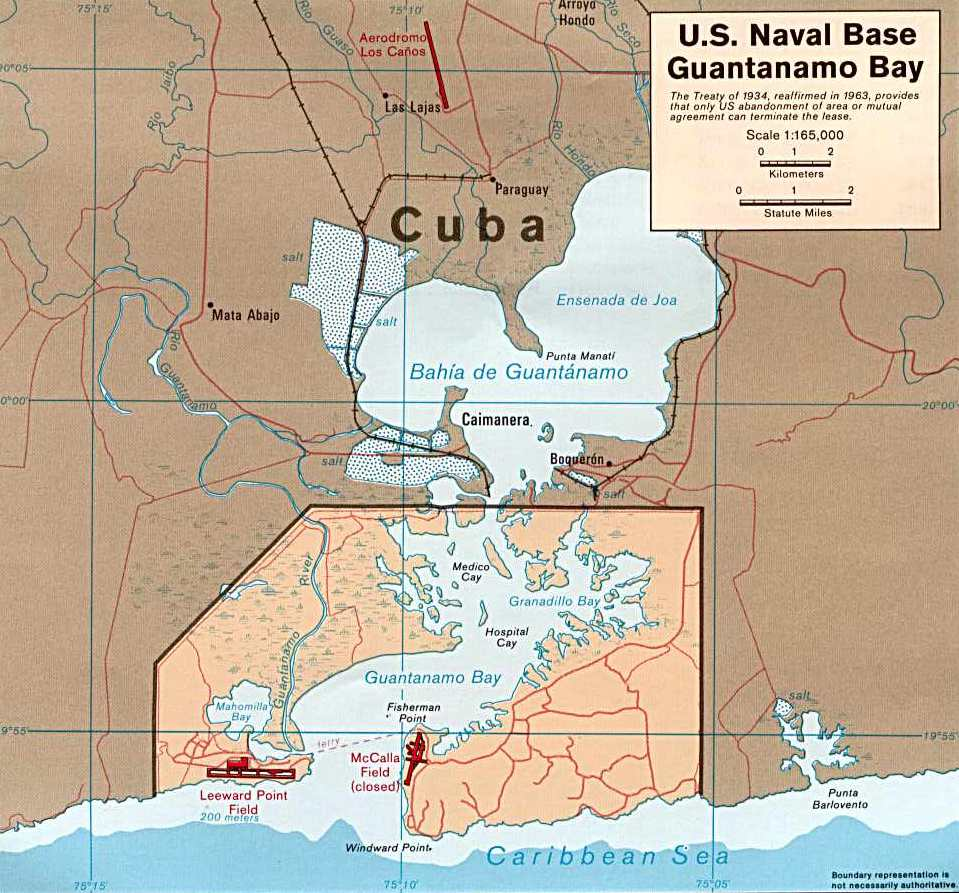
- Map of Guantánamo Bay, showing the location of Las Lajas

- Location of Las Lajas in Cuba
- Coordinates: 20°04′58″N 75°10′23″W
- Country: Cuba
- Province: Guantánamo
- Municipality: Guantánamo
- Time zone: UTC-5 (EST)
- Area code: +53-21

Las Lajas is a settlement in Cuba near Guantánamo Bay. It is located in the southern part of the municipality of Guantánamo, immediately west of Mariana Grajales Airport, previously known as "Los Caños" aerodrome.

== See also ==
- Paraguay (village)
- Arroyo Hondo
- List of cities in Cuba
