= Arroyo Hondo, Cuba =

Arrojo Hondo
- Village
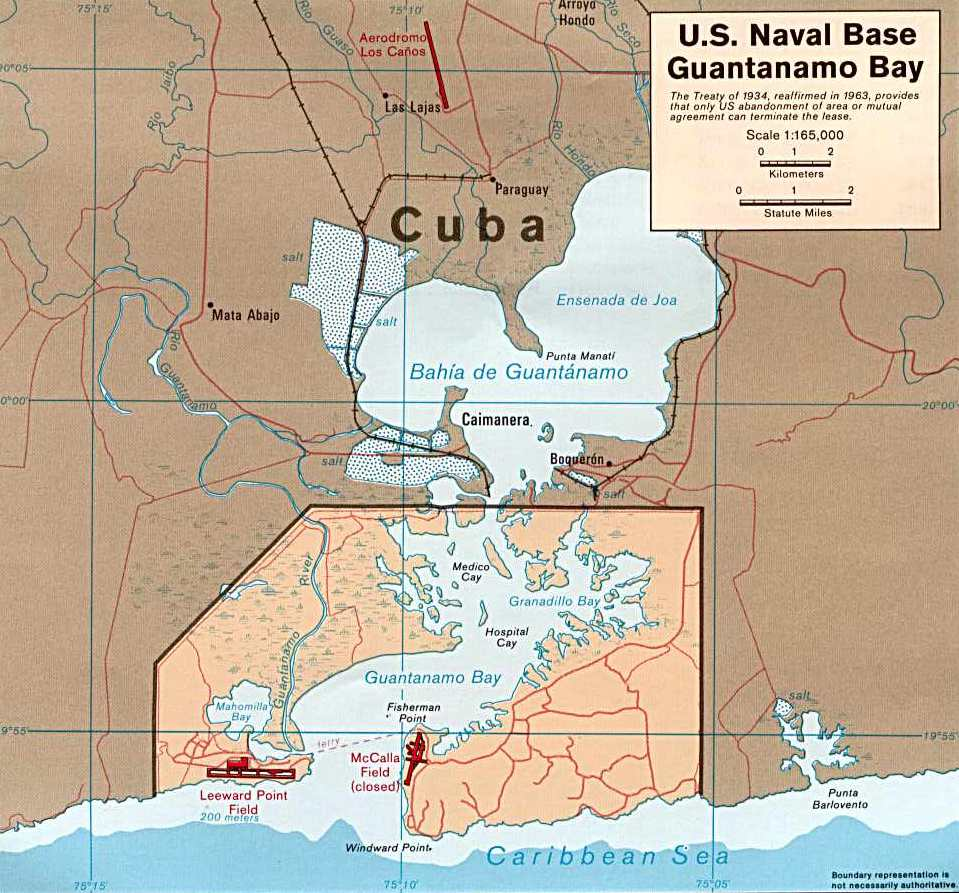
- Map of Guantánamo Bay, showing the location of Arroyo Hondo

- Location of Arroyo Hondo in Cuba
- Coordinates: 20°06′00″N 75°05′08″W
- Country: Cuba
- Province: Guantánamo
- Municipality: Guantánamo
- Consejo popular: Paraguay
- Time zone: UTC-5 (EST)
- Area code: +53-21

Arroyo Hondo is a settlement in Cuba near Guantánamo Bay. It is located in the municipality of Guantánamo.

== See also ==
- Las Lajas
- Paraguay (village)
- List of cities in Cuba
