= Guantánamo River =

River in Cuba

Coordinates: 19°55′N 75°12′W

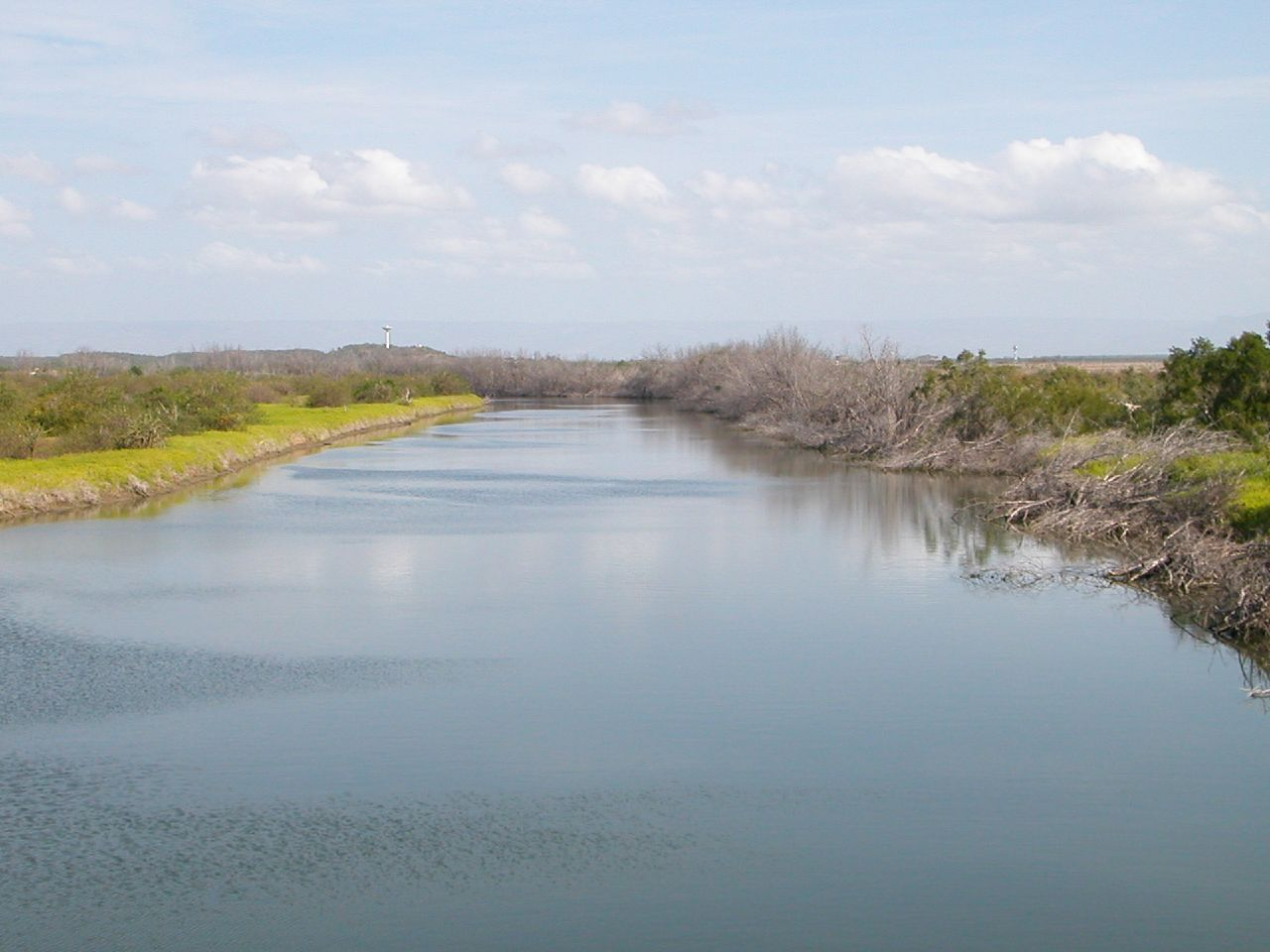
The Guantánamo River near Caimanera

Guantánamo River is a river of southern Cuba, that flows in the Province of Guantánamo up to Guantánamo Bay. La Yaya Dam is an embarkment dam on the river.

== See also ==
- List of rivers of Cuba
