= Paraguay, Cuba =

Paraguay
- Village
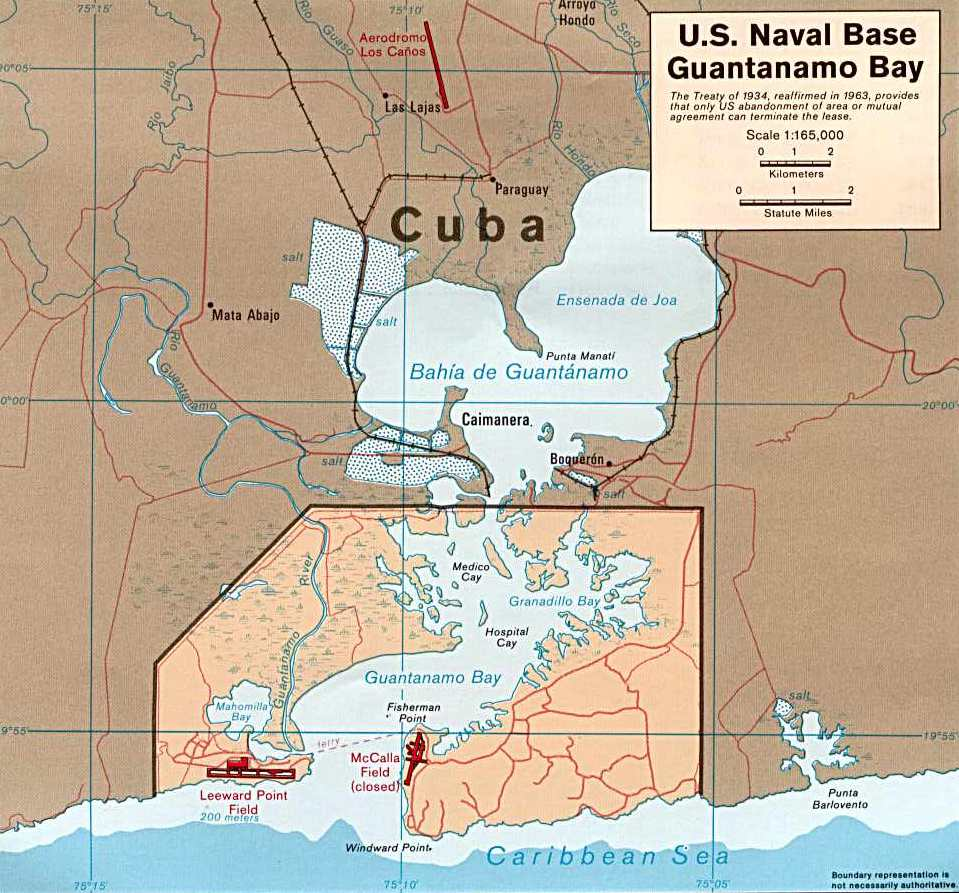
- Map of Guantánamo Bay, showing the location of Paraguay

- Location of Paraguay in Cuba
- Coordinates: 20°03′00″N 75°09′00″W
- Country: Cuba
- Province: Guantánamo
- Municipality: Caimanera
- Time zone: UTC-5 (EST)
- Area code: +53-21

Paraguay is a settlement and consejo popular ("popular council") in Cuba near Guantánamo Bay. It is located in the northern part of the municipality of Caimanera, near Mariana Grajales Airport.

== See also ==
- Las Lajas
- Arroyo Hondo
- List of cities in Cuba
