= Mariana Grajales Airport =

Airport serving Guantánamo, Cuba

- IATA: GAO; ICAO: MUGT

Summary
- Airport type: Public
- Serves: Guantánamo, Cuba
- Elevation AMSL: 17 m (56 ft)
- Coordinates: 20°05′07″N 075°09′29″W

Map
- Location in Cuba

Runways
Direction	Length		Surface
Direction	m	ft	Surface
17/35	2,358	7,736	Asphalt
- Source: DAFIF

Mariana Grajales Airport (IATA: GAO, ICAO: MUGT) is an airport serving Guantánamo, a city in Cuba. It is located near the villages of Paraguay and Las Lajas. The airport is named after Mariana Grajales Cuello.

== Construction ==
The runway was built during World War II by the US Navy as a reserve airfield for the US Guantanamo Bay Naval Base. Up to the 60s was known as "Los Caños" aerodrome.

== Facilities ==
The airport resides at an elevation of 17 m (56 ft) above mean sea level. It has one runway designated 17/35 with an asphalt surface measuring 2,358 m × 46 m (7,736 ft × 151 ft).
