= Niceto Pérez =

- Municipality
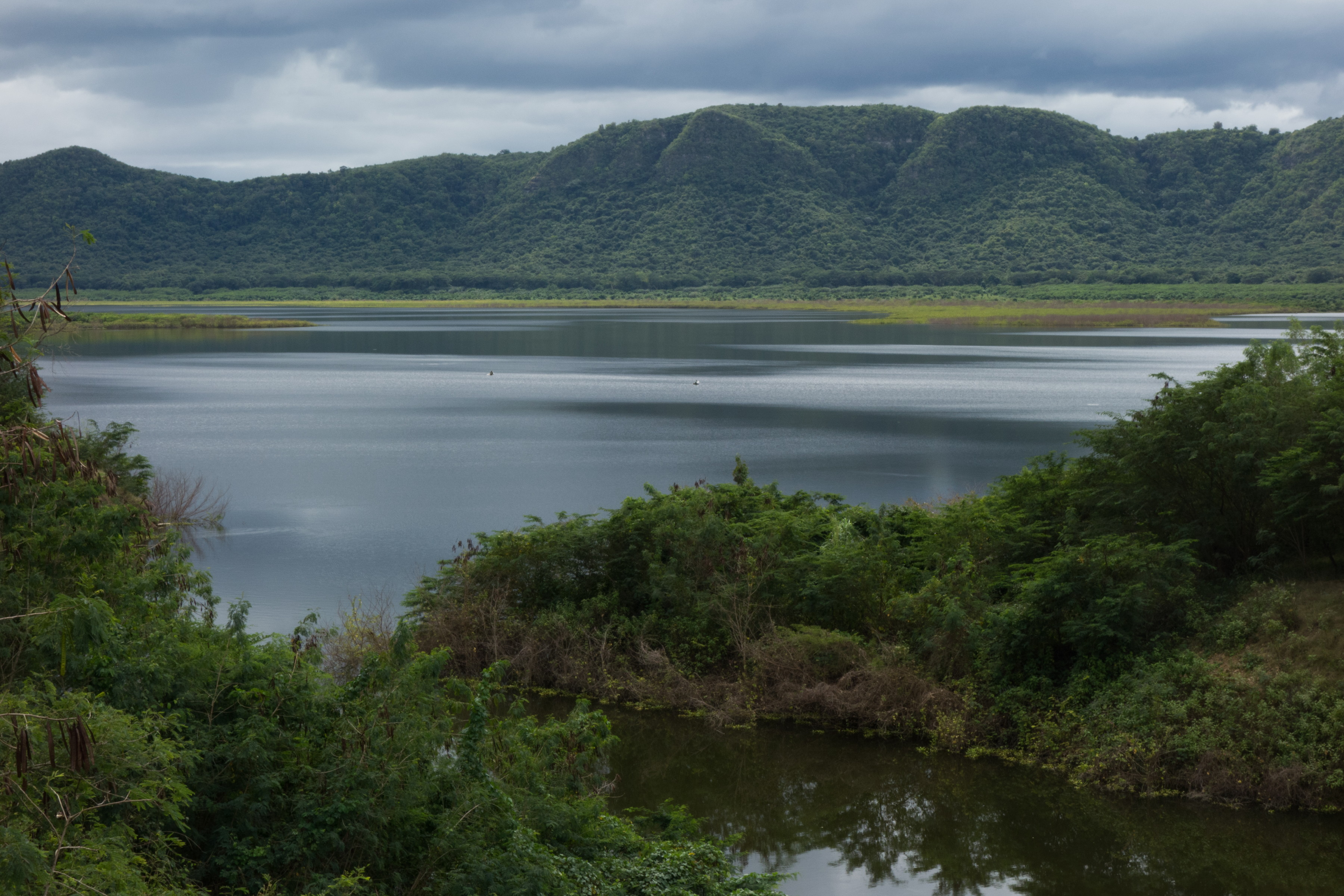
- La Yaya Reservoir

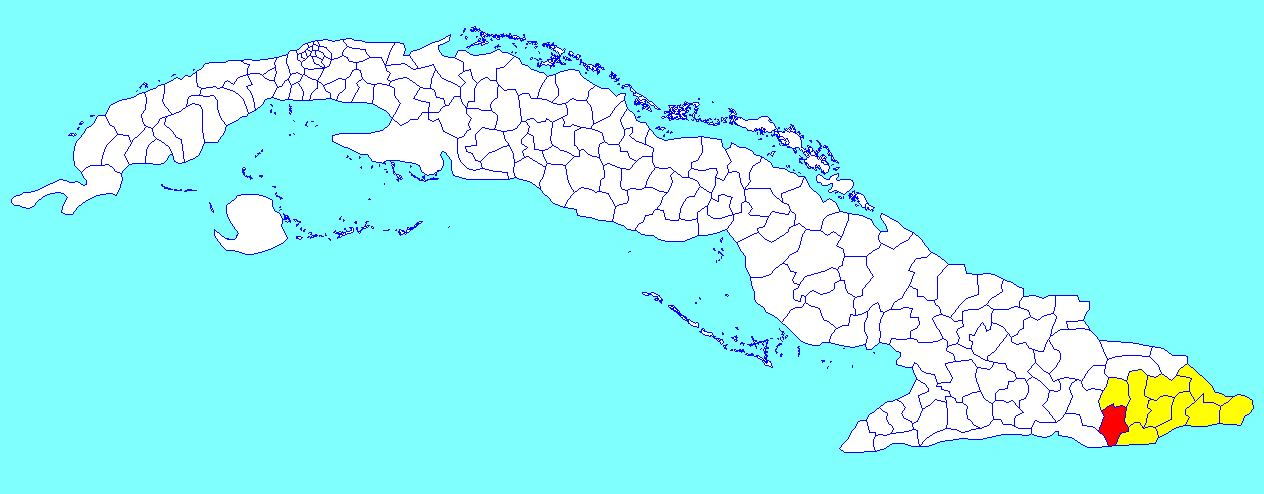
- Niceto Pérez municipality (red) within Guantánamo Province (yellow) and Cuba
- Coordinates: 20°07′39″N 75°20′32″W
- Country: Cuba
- Province: Guantánamo

Area
  - Total: 640 km^{2} (250 sq mi)
- Elevation: 60 m (200 ft)

Population (2022)
  - Total: 16,181
  - Density: 25/km^{2} (65/sq mi)
- Time zone: UTC-5 (EST)
- Area code: +53-21
- Website: https://www.nicetoperez.gob.cu/es/

Niceto Pérez (Spanish pronunciation: [niˈseto ˈpeɾes]) is a municipality and town in the Guantánamo Province of Cuba. It is located 10 kilometres (6.2 mi) west of the provincial capital, Guantánamo.

== Demographics ==
In 2022, the municipality of Niceto Pérez had a population of 16,181. With a total area of 640 km^{2} (250 sq mi), it has a population density of 25/km^{2} (65/sq mi).

== See also ==
- List of cities in Cuba
- Municipalities of Cuba
