= Guantánamo =

- City
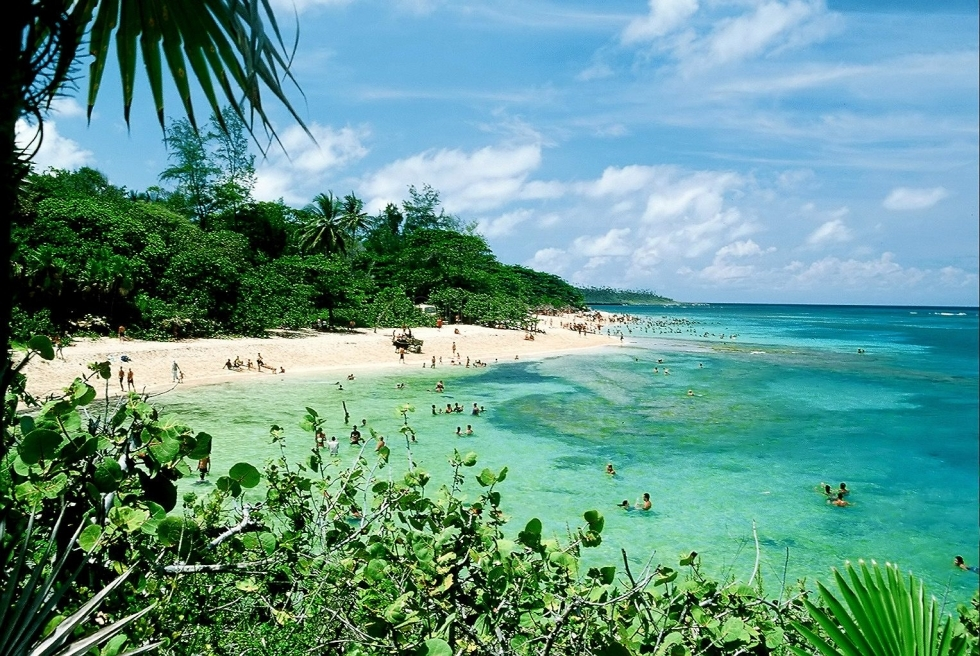
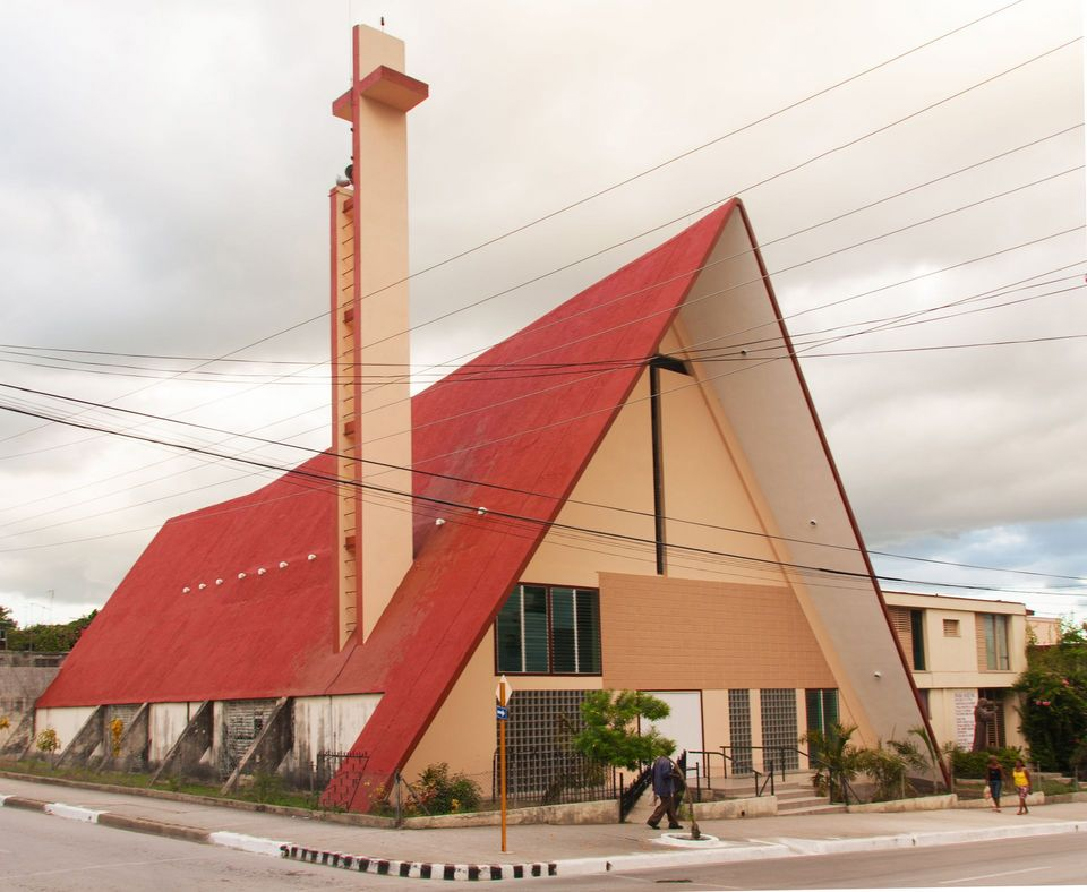
- Playa Baracoa Iglesia La Milagrosa

- Seal

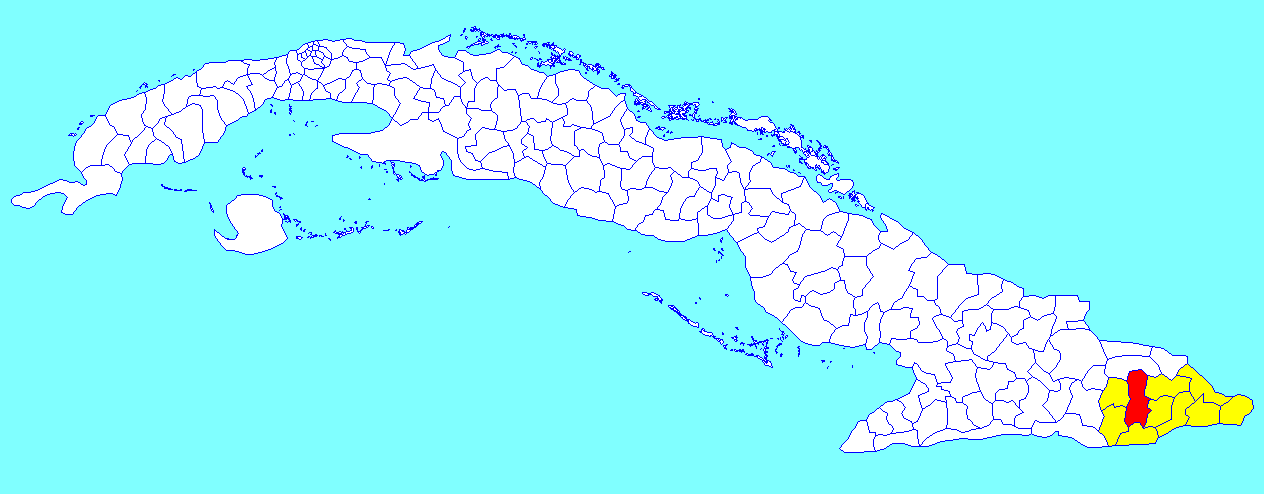
- Guantánamo municipality (red) within Guantánamo Province (yellow) and Cuba
- Coordinates: 20°08′12″N 75°12′50″W
- Country: Cuba
- Province: Guantánamo
- Established: 1797

Government
  - President: Idaliena Díaz Casamayor

Area
  - City: 741.4 km^{2} (286.3 sq mi)
- Elevation: 46 m (151 ft)

Population (2022)
  - City: 222,781
  - Rank: 5th
  - Density: 300.5/km^{2} (778.3/sq mi)
  - Urban: 214,036
- Demonym: Guantanamero/ra
- Time zone: UTC-5 (EST)
- Postal code: 95100
- Area code: +53 21

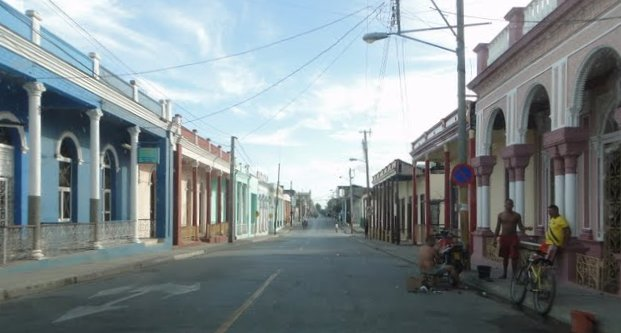
Main street in front of the post office

Guantánamo (UK: /ɡwænˈtænəmoʊ/, US: /ɡwɑːnˈtɑːn-/, Spanish: [ɡwanˈtanamo]) is a municipality and city in southeast Cuba and capital of Guantánamo Province.

Guantánamo is served by the Caimanera port near the site of a U.S. naval base. The area produces sugarcane and cotton wool. These are traditional parts of the economy.

== History ==
The city was founded in 1797 in the area of a farm named Santa Catalina. The toponym "Guantánamo" means, in Taíno language, "land between the rivers".

== Geography ==
The municipality is mountainous in the north, at Alejandro de Humboldt National Park, where it overlays the Sierra Maestra (mountains), and borders the Windward Passage of the Caribbean Sea in the south. It is crossed by the Bano, Guantánamo, Yateras, Guaso, San Andrés, and Sabanalamar rivers. The city is spread with a square plan and is crossed in the middle by the Carretera Central highway. Guantánamo Bay is a natural harbour south of it.

The municipality borders with El Salvador, Niceto Pérez, Caimanera, Yateras, Manuel Tames, and Sagua de Tánamo; this one in Holguín Province. It includes the villages of Argeo Martínez, Arroyo Hondo, Glorieta, Las Lajas, and Paraguay.

Prior to 1976 it was divided into the barrios and villages Arroyo Hondo, Baitiquirí, Bano, Bayate, Caimanera, Camarones, Caridad, Corralillo, Cuatro Caminos, Filipinas, Glorieta, Gobierno, Guaso, Hospital, Indios, Isleta, Jaibo Abajo, Las Lajas, Macurijes, Mercado, Ocujal, Parroquia, Palma de San Juan, Rastro, Tiguabos, and Vínculo. After a 1976 reform, part of the municipal territory was split into the municipalities of El Salvador, Niceto Pérez, Caimanera, and San Antonio del Sur.

=== United States Naval Base ===
About 15 kilometres (9 mi) away from the city lies the Guantánamo Bay, a superior natural harbor which has been utilized by the United States since 1898, when it was captured from Spain in the Battle of Guantánamo Bay. Cuba leased it to the U.S. in 1903 in fulfillment of a commitment made in the 1903 Cuban–American Treaty of Relations, and it remains the site of a US Navy base, as well as the Guantanamo Bay detention camp.

== Demographics ==
In 2022, the municipality of Guantánamo had a population of 222,781. With a total area of 741 km^{2} (286 sq mi), it has a population density of 300/km^{2} (780/sq mi).

=== Notable Guantanameros ===
Notable natives of Guantánamo include athletes Joel Casamayor, Erislandy Lara, Yuriorkis Gamboa, Yumileidi Cumbá, Jaime Jefferson, Yargelis Savigne, Dayron Robles, Luis Delís, gymnast Annia Hatch, Broadway and movie actress Olga Merediz, musician Diamela del Pozo, cosmonaut Arnaldo Tamayo Méndez, journalist Iliana Hernández and Major League Baseball player Luis Robert Jr. of the Chicago White Sox.

== Transport ==
=== Car ===
The city is served by the Carretera Central highway, and is the eastern terminus of the A1 motorway, that is mainly under construction and will link Guantánamo with Havana.

=== Railway ===
In July 2019, Cuba received its first new train cars in over four decades from China for the route between Havana and Guantanamo. The journey takes 15 hours. A round trip ticket from Havana to Guantanamo trip starts at 200 Cuban pesos ($8, €7).

=== Airport ===
Guantanamo's commercial airport, the Mariana Grajales Airport, is served by one airline, Cubana. It is located near the villages of Las Lajas and Paraguay.

== The song "Guantanamera" ==
"Guantanamera" (Spanish: "from Guantánamo [feminine]", thus "woman from Guantánamo") is perhaps the best known Cuban song and that country's most noted patriotic song. In 1966, a version by American vocal group The Sandpipers, based on an arrangement by Pete Seeger, became an international hit. The song was later also one of Cuban superstar singer Celia Cruz's biggest hits.

== Gallery ==
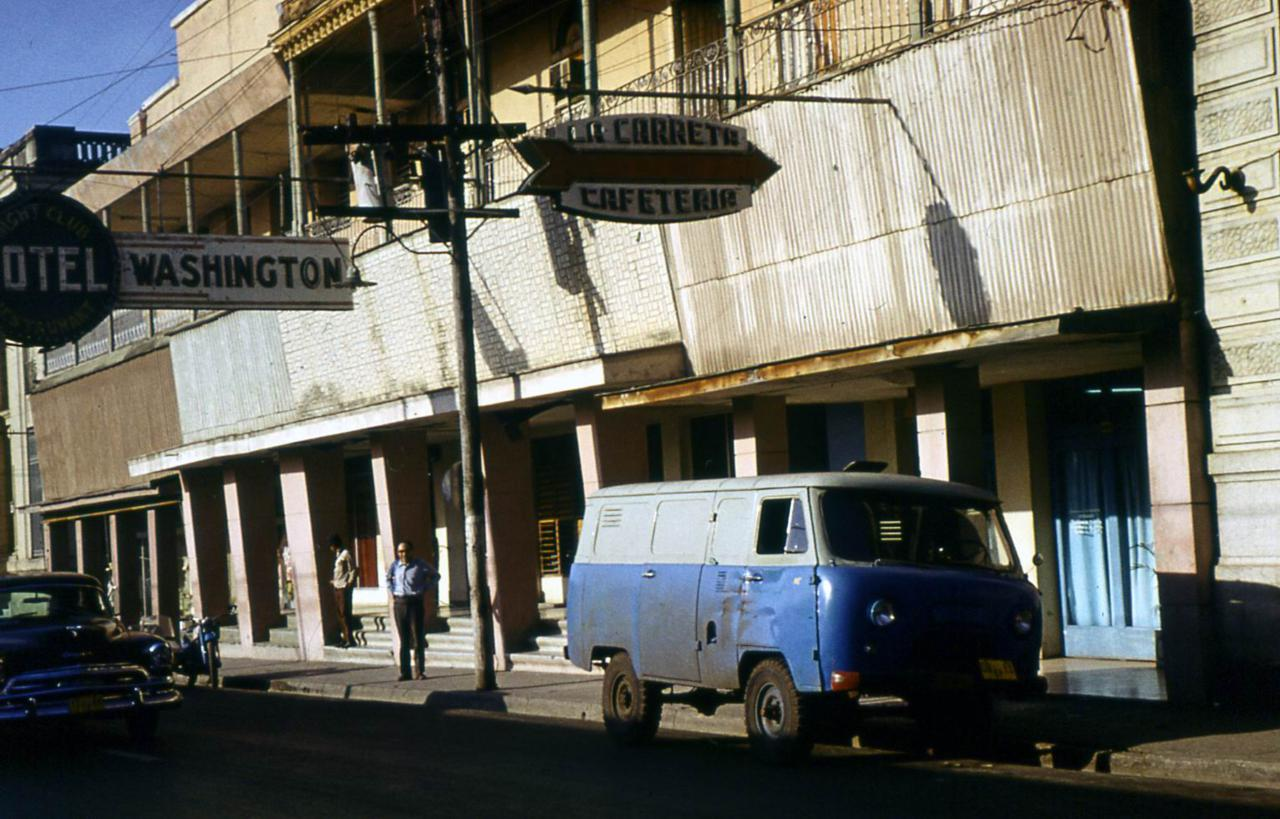
Hotel Washington (1974)

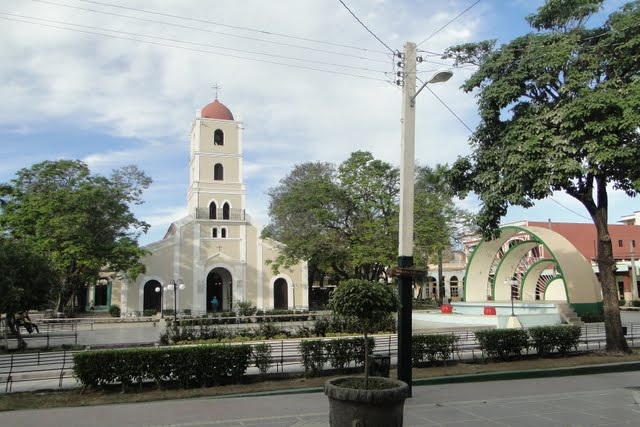
The Cathedral

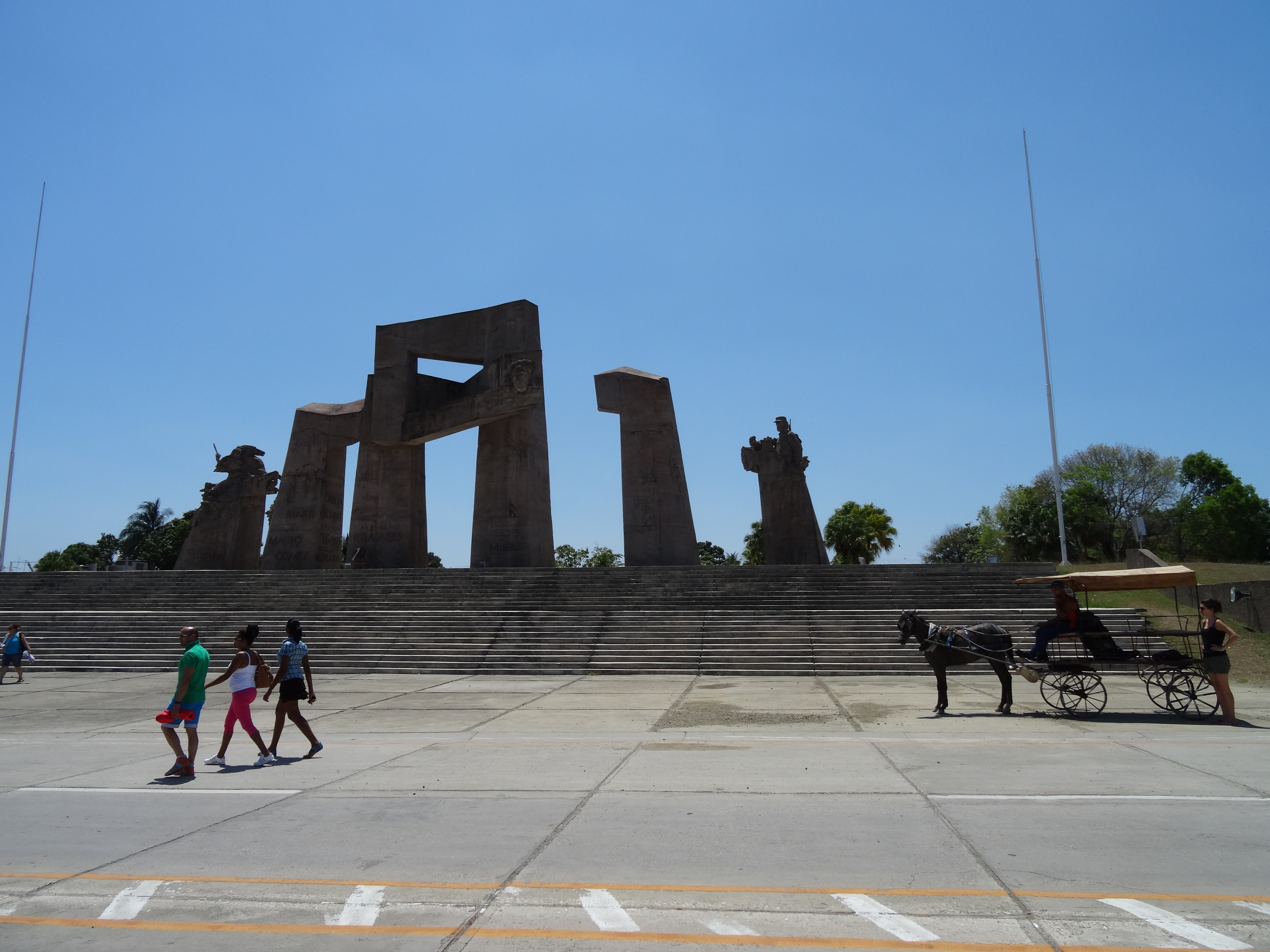
Plaza de la Revolución

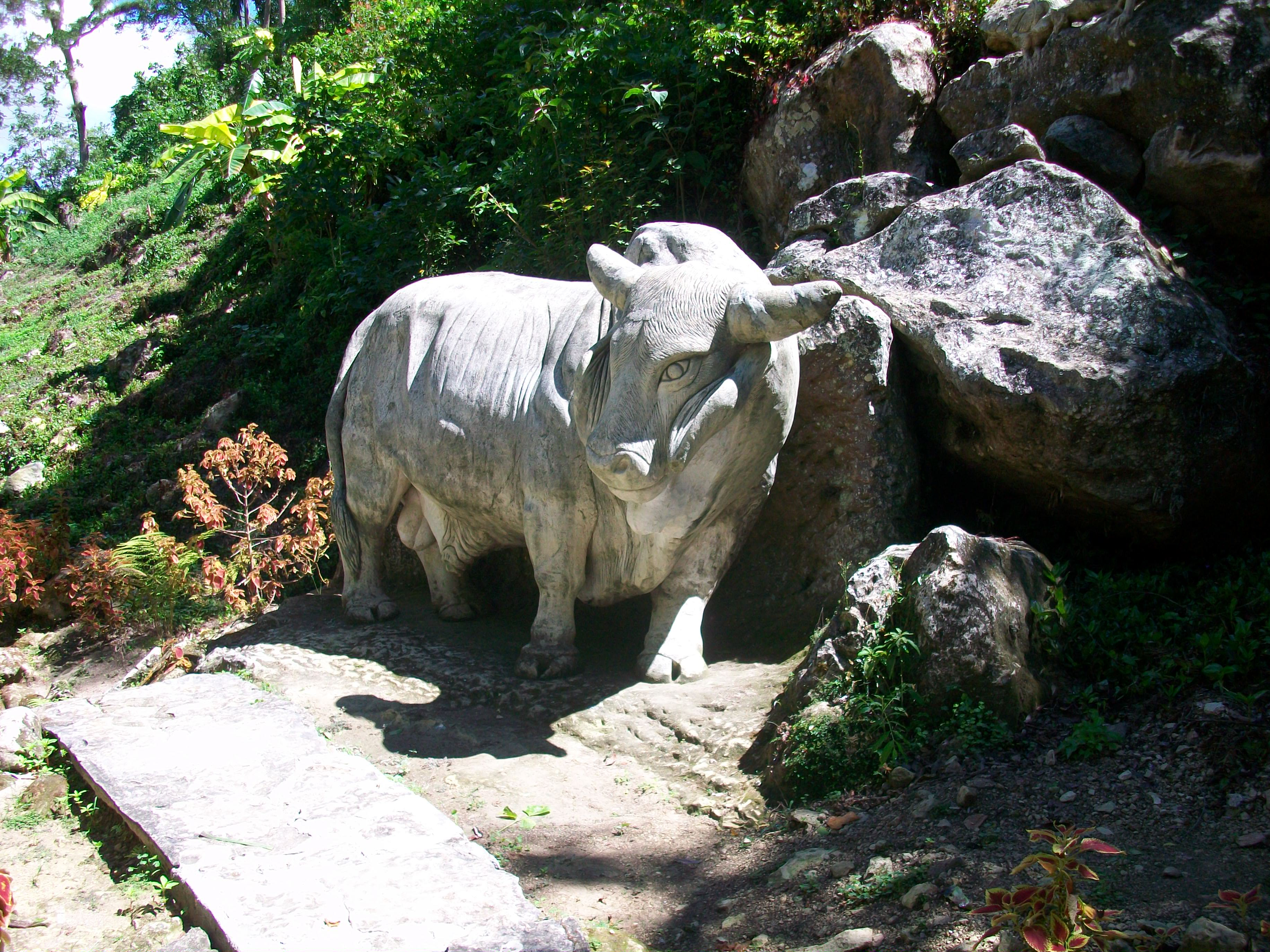
A sculpture of an ox in the "Zoológico de Piedra" (i.e.: "Stone Zoo")

== See also ==
- Oriente Province
- List of cities in Cuba
